The Steele dossier, also known as the Trump–Russia dossier, is a controversial political opposition research report written from June to December 2016, containing allegations of misconduct, conspiracy, and cooperation between Donald Trump's presidential campaign and the government of Russia prior to and during the 2016 election campaign. Five years later, it was described by mainstream media as "largely discredited", "deeply flawed", and "largely unverified". Some key dossier allegations were corroborated in the ODNI's 2017 assessment, namely that Vladimir Putin favored Trump over Hillary Clinton; that he personally ordered an "influence campaign" to harm Clinton's electoral chances and "undermine public faith in the US democratic process"; that he ordered cyber attacks on the Democratic and Republican parties; and that many Trump campaign officials and associates had numerous secretive contacts with Russian officials and spies.

The dossier, leaked by BuzzFeed News in January 2017, without its author's permission, is an unfinished  compilation of raw intelligence based on information from initially anonymous sources known to the author, counterintelligence specialist Christopher Steele. Steele, a former head of the Russia Desk for British intelligence (MI6), was writing the report for the private investigative firm Fusion GPS, who were paid by Hillary Clinton's campaign and the Democratic National Committee (DNC). The dossier's 17 reports allege that Trump campaign members and Russian operatives had conspired to cooperate in Russia's election interference to benefit Trump. It also alleges that Russia sought to damage Hillary Clinton's candidacy. BuzzFeeds decision to publish the reports without verifying their allegations was criticized by journalists but their decision was also defended in a court statement explaining that BuzzFeeds action was for the public good as the public had a right to know so it could "exercise effective oversight of the government".

In June 2016, Fusion GPS subcontracted Steele's firm to compile the dossier. DNC officials denied knowing their attorney had contracted with Fusion GPS, and Steele asserted he was not aware the Clinton campaign was the recipient of his research until months after he contracted with Fusion GPS. While compiling the dossier, Steele passed some of his findings to both British and American intelligence services.

The intelligence community and most experts have treated the dossier with caution due to its unverified allegations, that Trump denounced as fake news. The U.S. intelligence community took the allegations seriously, and the Federal Bureau of Investigation (FBI) investigated every line of the dossier and identified and spoke with at least two of Steele's sources.  The Mueller Report contained passing references to some of the dossier's allegations but little mention of its more sensational claims.

Many allegations in the dossier have been dismissed by authorities or remain unverified. While the dossier played a central role in the seeking of FISA warrants on Carter Page, it did not play any role in the intelligence community's assessment about Russian actions in the 2016 election, and it was not the trigger for the opening of the Russia investigation into whether the Trump campaign was coordinating with the Russian government's interference in the 2016 presidential election. The dossier is a factor in several conspiracy theories promoted by Trump and his supporters in the media and Congress.

History

Two research operations and confusion between them 

The opposition research conducted by Fusion GPS on Donald Trump was in two distinct operations, each with a different client. From April 2016 into early May, the Washington Free Beacon and the Clinton Campaign/DNC were independently both clients of Fusion GPS. This overlap led to confusion in the media.

The first operation, from October 2015 to May 2016, was domestic research funded by The Washington Free Beacon based on public sources, none of which ended up in the dossier. It was later misattributed as research for what became the Steele dossier.

The second operation, from April 2016 to December 2016, was funded by the DNC and the Clinton campaign. Only this second operation involved the foreign research used to create the dossier.

First operation: Research funded by conservative website not connected to dossier 

In October 2015, before the official start of the 2016 Republican primary campaign, the founders of Fusion GPS were seeking political work and wrote an email to "a big conservative donor they knew who disliked Trump, [and] they were hired". He arranged for them to use The Washington Free Beacon, an American conservative political journalism website, for their general opposition research on several Republican presidential candidates, including Trump. It is primarily funded by Republican donor Paul Singer. The Free Beacon and Singer were "part of the conservative never-Trump movement". Although Singer was a big supporter of Marco Rubio, Rubio denied any involvement in Fusion GPS's initial research and hiring.

Early in their investigation, they received help from investigative reporter Wayne Barrett, who gave them his files on Trump. They contained findings about "Trump's past dealings, including tax and bankruptcy problems, potential ties to organized crime, and numerous legal entanglements. They also revealed that Trump had an unusually high number of connections to Russians with questionable backgrounds."

For months, Fusion GPS gathered information about Trump, focusing on his business and entertainment activities. When Trump became the presumptive nominee on May 3, 2016, the conservative donor stopped funding the research on him.

In October 2017, the Free Beacon issued a statement:

Although the source of the Steele dossier's funding had already been reported correctly over a year before, and the Free Beacon had issued a statement to this effect in October 2017, a February 2, 2018, story by the Associated Press (AP) contributed to confusion about its funding by stating that the dossier "was initially funded" by the Washington Free Beacon, so the AP posted a correction the next day: "Though the former spy, Christopher Steele, was hired by a firm that was initially funded by the Washington Free Beacon, he did not begin work on the project until after Democratic groups had begun funding it."

By the spring of 2016, researchers at Fusion GPS had become so alarmed by what they had already learned about Trump that they felt the need "to do what they could to keep Trump out of the White House".

Second operation: Research funded by Democrats produces dossier 

The second operation of opposition research was indirectly funded by the DNC and the Clinton campaign, working through their attorney of record, Marc Elias of Perkins Coie. In an October 2017 letter, Perkins Coie general counsel Matthew Gehringer described how, in March 2016, Fusion GPS approached Perkins Coie and, knowing the Clinton campaign and the DNC were its clients, inquired whether its clients wished to pay Fusion GPS "to continue research regarding then-presidential candidate Donald Trump, research that Fusion GPS had conducted for one or more other clients during the Republican primary contest." In April 2016, Elias hired Fusion GPS to perform opposition research on Trump.

Fusion GPS co-founder Glenn R. Simpson had some reservations, as he did not like the idea of helping Hillary Clinton. In an email, Simpson said "The only way I could see working for HRC is if it is against Trump."

In June 2016, as part of its work for Perkins Coie, Fusion GPS hired Orbis Business Intelligence, a private British intelligence firm, to look into connections between Trump and Russia. Orbis co-founder Christopher Steele, a retired British MI6 officer with expertise in Russian matters, was hired as a subcontractor to do the job. Prior to his work on the dossier, Steele had been a paid informant for the FBI for information unrelated to the Russia investigation.

In total, Perkins Coie paid Fusion GPS $1.02million in fees and expenses, of which Fusion GPS paid Orbis $168,000 to produce the dossier. The DNC and Clinton campaign disclosed the total amount paid to Perkins Coie on campaign finance reports. In March 2022, the Federal Election Commission (FEC) fined the DNC $105,000 and the Clinton campaign $8,000 for misreporting those fees and expenses as "legal services" and "legal and compliance consulting" rather than "opposition research".

Orbis was hired between June and November 2016, and Steele produced 16 reports during that time, with a 17th report added in December. The reports were like "prepublication notes" based on information from Steele's sources, and were not released as a fully vetted and "finished news article". Steele believes 70–90 percent of the dossier is accurate, a view shared by Simpson.

Steele delivered his reports individually to Fusion GPS as one- to three-page numbered reports. The first report, dated June 20, 2016, was sent to Washington by courier and hand-delivered to Fusion GPS. The names of the sources were redacted and replaced with descriptions to help Fusion judge their credibility.

Luke Harding wrote:

Steele has said he soon found "troubling information indicating connections between Trump and the Russian government". According to his sources, "there was an established exchange of information between the Trump campaign and the Kremlin of mutual benefit". According to Harding, "Steele was shocked by the extent of collusion his sources were reporting", and told his friends: "For anyone who reads it, this is a life-changing experience." Steele felt what he had unearthed "was something of huge significance, way above party politics". American reporter Howard Blum described Steele's rationale for becoming a whistleblower: "The greater good trumps all other concerns."

On his own initiative, Steele decided to also pass the information to British and American intelligence services because he believed the findings were a matter of national security for both countries. In 2018, Steele told a UK parliamentary investigation that Theresa May's British government covered up the evidence he provided them of Trump's Russian ties and took no actions, and that Boris Johnson suppressed a report about the intelligence in the dossier that was prepared by Parliament's Intelligence and Security Committee. After long delay, the report was published on July 21, 2020.

According to Simpson's testimony, Steele, who enjoyed a good working reputation "for the knowledge he had developed over nearly 20 years working on Russia-related issues for British intelligence, approached the FBI because he was concerned that Trump, then a candidate, was being blackmailed by Russia, and he became "very concerned about whether this represented a national security threat". Steele believed the intelligence community "needed urgently to know—if it didn't already—that the next possible U.S. president was potentially under the sway of Russia".

In early July 2016, Steele called seasoned FBI agent Michael Gaeta, who was stationed in Rome, and asked him to come to London so he could show him his findings. Because he was assigned to the U.S. embassy in Rome, Gaeta sought and was granted approval for the trip from Victoria Nuland, who was then the Assistant Secretary of State for European and Eurasian Affairs. When he arrived in London on July 5, 2016, he met with Steele at his office, and he was given a copy of Steele's first report, dated June 20, 2016 (Report 80). His reaction was "shock and horror". Alarmed by what he read, Gaeta remarked, "I have to show this to headquarters".

As Nuland later shared, "In the middle of July, when he [Steele] was doing this other work and became concerned, he passed two to four pages of short points of what he was finding and our immediate reaction to that was, 'This is not in our purview.' This needs to go to the FBI if there is any concern here that one candidate or the election as a whole might be influenced by the Russian Federation. That's something for the FBI to investigate." Shortly after, in July, the report was sent to an agent with expertise in criminal organizations and organized crime at the FBI's New York field office—essentially, the wrong person to handle a counterintelligence investigation. According to Nancy LeTourneau, political writer for the Washington Monthly, the report "was languishing in the FBI's New York field office" for two months, and "was finally sent to the counterintelligence team investigating Russia at FBI headquarters in Washington, D.C." in mid-September 2016.

In August 2016, the FBI asked Steele for "all information in his possession and for him to explain how the material had been gathered and to identify his sources". In October 2016, Steele "described the sources' access, but did not provide names" to the FBI. By August 22, 2017, Steele had provided them with the names of the sources for the allegations in the dossier.

Meanwhile, in the July to September time frame, according to The Washington Post, CIA Director John Brennan had started an investigation with a secret task force "composed of several dozen analysts and officers from the CIA, the NSA and the FBI". At the same time, he was busy creating his own dossier of material documenting that "Russia was not only attempting to interfere in the 2016 election, they were doing so in order to elect Donald Trump... [T]he entire intelligence community was on alert about this situation at least two months before [the dossier] became part of the investigation." The "Steele dossier has so far proven to be fairly accurate", LeTourneau wrote.

In early August, Steele was summoned to Rome where he gave a full briefing to four American FBI officials about the report. At that time, he handed over the June 20 and July 26 reports.

During its intense questioning of Steele, the FBI mentioned their own discoveries of connections between the Trump campaign and Russia and asked Steele about Papadopoulos, but he said he knew nothing about him. The agents "raised the prospect of paying Steele to continue gathering intelligence after Election Day", but Steele "ultimately never received payment from the FBI for any 'dossier'-related information". In October 2022, during questioning from Special Counsel John Durham, Brian Auten, a supervisory counterintelligence analyst with the FBI, testified that, shortly before the 2016 election, the FBI offered Steele "up to $1 million" if he could corroborate allegations in the dossier, but that Steele could not do so. Steele has disputed this description: "And to correct the Danchenko trial record, we were not offered $1 million by the FBI to ‘prove up’ our Trump-Russia reporting. Rather, we were told there were substantial funds to resettle sources in the US if they were prepared to testify in public. Understandably they were not."

The subsequent public release of the dossier stopped discussions between Steele and the FBI. Simpson testified that "Steele wasn't paid by the FBI, but was possibly reimbursed for a trip to Rome to meet with FBI officials." According to Mayer, Steele asked the FBI to cover his travel expenses to Rome, but he received nothing. The Inspector General's report later confirmed that the FBI had initially offered to pay Steele $15,000 for his trip to Rome, but when the FBI dropped Steele as a confidential human source because he had shared information with a third party "in late October 2016" (Mother Jones magazine), the payment was halted. Peter Strzok reported that:

In September, Steele met with Jonathan Winer, who was then the U.S. deputy assistant secretary of state for international law enforcement, whom he had known since 2009. In a 2018 editorial for The Washington Post, Winer recounted that during their meeting in Washington, he was allowed to review Steele's reports, but not to keep a copy: "I prepared a two-page summary and shared it with [Victoria] Nuland, who indicated that, like me, she felt that the secretary of state needed to be made aware of this material," he wrote. Later in September, Winer discussed the report with Sidney Blumenthal, who revealed he had received similar information from Cody Shearer, a controversial political activist and former journalist who was close to the Clinton White House in the 1990s. Winer met with Steele again in late September and gave him a copy of Shearer's report, later known as the "second dossier".

On September 19, 2016, Steele's handling agent sent six of Steele's reports (80, 94, 95, 100, 101, and 102) to the Crossfire Hurricane team, that had been operational since July 31, 2016. This was the first time they and their leader, Deputy Assistant Director of the FBI's Counterespionage Section, Peter Strzok, received any of Steele's reporting. Some reports referred to members of Trump's inner circle. After that point, he continued to share information with the FBI. The IG Report says this material "became an important part of the Crossfire Hurricane investigation and the FBI seeking FISA authority targeting one of the Crossfire Hurricane subjects, Carter Page."

On October 28, 2016, days before the election, Comey notified Congress that the FBI had started looking into newly discovered Hillary Clinton emails. Simpson and Fritsch described their reaction: "Comey's bombshell prompted the Fusion partners to decide they needed to do what they could to expose the FBI's probe of Trump and Russia. It was Hail Mary time." The founders of Fusion GPS were very upset by a misleading November 1, 2016, New York Times article "published a week before the election with the headline: 'Investigating Donald Trump, FBI Sees No Clear Link to Russia'. In fact, Russia was meddling in the election to help Trump win, the U.S. intelligence community would later conclude..."

Simpson later said that "Steele severed his contacts with [the] FBI before the election following public statements by the FBI that it had found no connection between the Trump campaign and Russia and concerns that [the FBI] was being 'manipulated for political ends by the Trump people'." Steele had become frustrated with the FBI, whom he believed failed to investigate his reports, choosing instead to focus on the investigation into Clinton's emails. According to The Independent, Steele came to believe there was a "cabal" inside the FBI, particularly its New York field office linked to Trump advisor Rudy Giuliani, because it blocked any attempts to investigate the links between Trump and Russia.

What the DNC, Clinton campaign, and Steele knew 

According to Fusion GPS's co-owners, Glenn Simpson and Peter Fritsch, they did not tell Steele who their ultimate clients were, only that Steele was "working for a law firm", and they "gave him no specific marching orders beyond this basic question: 'Why did Mr. Trump repeatedly seek to do deals in a notoriously corrupt police state that most serious investors shun?'" In testimony to the Senate Intelligence Committee, Simpson said that "it was Fusion GPS's idea to pursue overseas ties—that research was not directed by Perkins Coie, the DNC, or the Clinton Campaign".

Jane Mayer reported that when the Clinton campaign "indirectly employed" Steele, Elias created a "legal barrier" by acting as a "firewall" between the campaign and Steele. Thus, any details were protected by attorney–client privilege and work-product privileges. "Fusion briefed only Elias on the reports, Simpson sent Elias nothing on paper—he was briefed orally", Mayer reported. In its application for a FISA warrant to survey Carter Page, the Department of Justice told the FISC that Simpson had not informed Steele of the motivation behind the research into Trump's ties with Russia. Steele testified to Congress that he did not know the Clinton campaign was the source of the payments "because he was retained by Fusion GPS". By "late July 2016", "several months" after signing the contract with Fusion GPS, Steele became aware that the DNC and the Clinton campaign were the ultimate clients.

A spokesperson for the DNC said neither Tom Perez nor "the new leadership of the DNC were... involved in any decision-making regarding Fusion GPS, nor were they aware that Perkins Coie was working with the organization." A spokesperson for Perkins Coie said the campaign and the DNC were unaware Fusion GPS "had been hired to conduct the research". The Washington Post reported that it is not clear how much of the research Elias received from Fusion GPS he shared with the campaign and the DNC. It is also not clear who in those organizations knew about the roles of Fusion GPS and Steele, but one person "close to the matter" said the organizations were "not informed by the law firm of Fusion GPS's role". The New York Times revealed that earlier in 2017, "Mr. Elias had denied that he had possessed the dossier before the election." The Clinton campaign did not know about Steele or that he was sharing his findings with the FBI, and "one top Clinton campaign official" told Jane Mayer that "If I'd known the F.B.I. was investigating Trump, I would have been shouting it from the rooftops!"

The firewall was reportedly so effective even campaign principals John Podesta and Robby Mook did not know Steele was on the Democratic payroll until Mother Jones reported on the issue on October 31, 2016, in an article that did not name Steele. When the Mother Jones story broke, John Podesta, chairman of the Clinton campaign, said he was "stunned by the news that the FBI had launched a full-blown investigation into Trump, especially one that was informed by research underwritten by the Clinton campaign." Although they knew Perkins Coie had spent money for opposition research, neither Podesta nor campaign manager Robby Mook knew Steele was on the Democratic payroll. Mayer said they both maintain they "didn't read the dossier until BuzzFeed posted it online". She has also said that "the Clinton campaign never learned that Christopher Steele was on their payroll until it [the dossier] was in the press." "Far from a secret campaign weapon, Steele turned out to be a secret kept from the campaign." In their 2019 book, the founders of Fusion GPS wrote "...that no one from Fusion ever met or talked with Clinton and that she herself 'had no idea who they were'."

Philip Bump wrote that the dossier "has never been shown to have informed the Clinton campaign's approach and that was not made public until shortly before Trump was inaugurated."

On February 15, 2022, The Washington Post reported: "So far, there is no evidence that the Clinton campaign directly managed the Steele reporting or leaks about it to the media."

Hints of existence 

The founders of Fusion GPS have described how they did not hide the fact that they were researching Trump and Russia: "Fusion and Steele tried to alert U.S. law enforcement and the news media to the material they'd uncovered..." and their office became "something of a public reading room" for journalists seeking information. In September they arranged a private meeting between Steele and reporters from The Washington Post, The New York Times, The New Yorker, ABC News, and other outlets. The results were disappointing, as none published any stories before the election.

Jane Mayer has described how, in "late summer, Fusion set up a series of meetings, at the Tabard Inn, in Washington, between Steele and a handful of national-security reporters.... Despite Steele's generally cool manner, he seemed distraught about the Russians' role in the election." Mayer attended one of the meetings. None of these news organizations ran any stories about the allegations at that time.

Before the election, only two news sources mentioned allegations that came from dossier reports. Steele had been in contact with both authors. These were a September 23, 2016, Yahoo! News article by Michael Isikoff that focused on Carter Page, and an article by David Corn on October 31, 2016, a week before the election, in Mother Jones magazine.

At the time, the FBI had assumed that the source for the Yahoo! article was someone, other than Steele, "who had received a copy of the dossier". The 2019 DOJ report by Michael Horowitz criticized the FBI for failing to ask Steele if he had a role in that Yahoo! article.

Mother Jones story 

By the third quarter of 2016, many news organizations knew about the existence of the dossier that had been described as an "open secret" among journalists, but chose not to publish information they could not confirm. Mother Jones was the first to report the existence of the dossier and that it was exclusively funded by Democrats.

By October 2016, Steele had compiled 33 pages (16 reports), and he then passed on what he had discovered to David Corn, a reporter from Mother Jones magazine. On October 31, 2016, a week before the election, Mother Jones reported that a former intelligence officer, whom they did not name, had produced a report based on Russian sources and turned it over to the FBI. The article disclosed some of the dossier's allegations:

Post-election events 

After Trump's election on November 8, 2016, the Democratic client stopped paying for the investigation, but Steele continued working on the dossier for Fusion GPS. According to The Independent, at that time, Simpson "reportedly spent his own money to continue the investigation". According to The New York Times, after the election, Steele's dossier became one of Washington's "worst-kept secrets", and journalists worked to verify the allegations.

On November 18, 2016, Republican Senator John McCain, who had been informed about the alleged links between the Kremlin and Trump, met with former British ambassador to Moscow Sir Andrew Wood at the Halifax International Security Forum in Canada. Wood told McCain about the existence of the collected materials about Trump, and also vouched for Steele's professionalism and integrity.

According to Simpson's August 22, 2017, testimony to the Senate Judiciary Committee, Steele and David J. Kramer, a longtime McCain aide and former U.S. State Department official working at Arizona State University, met each other at the Halifax forum and discussed the dossier. Kramer told Steele that McCain wanted to "ask questions about it at the FBI.... All we sort of wanted was for the government to do its job and we were concerned about whether the information that we provided previously had ever, you know, risen to the leadership level of the FBI."

Steele had agreed with Fusion GPS to deliver a hard copy of all 16 reports to McCain, that McCain received in early December from Kramer. On December 9, McCain met personally with FBI Director James Comey and gave him a copy of the dossier. On March 25, 2019, Senator Lindsey Graham, a close friend of McCain's, contradicted Trump's attacks against McCain and revealed that when McCain showed him the dossier, he had encouraged McCain to give the dossier to the FBI and that McCain acted appropriately. Graham described how he confronted Trump: "Senator McCain deserves better. There were some McCain people who took a piece of garbage and tried to go after Trump after the election. But I told the president it was not John McCain." Comey later confirmed that counterintelligence investigations were under way into possible links between Trump associates and Moscow.

After delivering his 16 reports to McCain, Steele received more information and composed the two-page "December memo", dated December 13. It mostly contained allegations against Trump's personal attorney, Michael Cohen, that Cohen later denied. In an April 2017 court filing, Steele revealed previously unreported information that he had given a copy of his last report to a "senior UK government national security official acting in his official capacity, on a confidential basis in hard copy form", because it "had implications for the national security of the US and the UK".

Both Simpson and Steele have denied providing the dossier to BuzzFeed. Unsealed documents from the discovery process in Russian entrepreneur Aleksej Gubarev's defamation lawsuit revealed that David Kramer, an associate of John McCain, gave the dossier to BuzzFeed "in December 2016, weeks after the election", in what Fritsch has called an "ill-advised" Hail Mary pass. It was never intended that the dossier be public because it was unfinished raw intelligence and could have "compromised sources and methods". Steele was also worried about the safety of his source network, and he expressed concern that if Trump won the election, the new FBI director, and other agency heads appointed by Trump, might be more loyal to Trump "and could decide to take action against Steele and his source network".

Briefings of Obama and Trump 

On January 5, 2017, the chiefs of four U.S. intelligence agencies briefed President Barack Obama and Vice President Joe Biden about the Russian interference in the election and the existence of the dossier and its allegations.

On the afternoon of January 6, 2017, President-elect Trump and his transition team received a similar briefing in Trump Tower. All four of the top intelligence chiefs met with Trump and his transition team. They were Director of National Intelligence James Clapper, FBI Director James Comey, CIA Director John Brennan, and NSA Director Admiral Mike Rogers. They informed Trump of the Russian election interference, and Comey told them of "a piece of Steele's reporting that indicated Russia had files of derogatory information on both Clinton and the President-elect".

Then, according to a pre-arranged plan, Brennan, Clapper, and Rogers left, and Comey then asked to speak with Trump alone. Comey then informed Trump of the dossier and its allegations about salacious tapes held by the Russians. Comey later reported he was very nervous. The previous day, the secretary of the Department of Homeland Security told Comey to "be very careful", "choose your words carefully", and then "get outta there". Trump became very defensive, and Comey described the meeting as "really weird". Trump later expressed that he felt James Comey was trying to blackmail him at the meeting in Trump Tower, held two weeks before the inauguration. In April 2018, Comey said he did not inform Trump the dossier was partly funded by Democrats because that "wasn't necessary for my goal, which was to alert him that we had this information".

The Mueller Report, published on April 18, 2019, contains a footnote that suggests that Trump may have heard that Russia had incriminating tapes of his behavior. On October 30, 2016, Michael Cohen had received a text from Giorgi Rtskhiladze reporting that he had successfully stopped the "flow of tapes from Russia". Rtskhiladze told investigators that these were compromising tapes of Trump, and Cohen told investigators he had spoken to Trump about the issue. Rtskhiladze later told investigators "he was told the tapes were fake, but he did not communicate that to Cohen".

On December 14, 2018, the FBI released a document called "Annex A", that was "part of [the] Russia dossier summary" used to brief Trump and Obama. The FBI withheld parts of the synopsis on the grounds that it remained classified and "because it pertains to ongoing investigations or court proceedings, originated with a confidential source or describes confidential investigative techniques or procedures".

Two days after the publication of the dossier on January 10, 2017, James Clapper issued a statement describing the leaks in the press about their Trump Tower meeting with Trump as damaging to U.S. national security. The statement also included the non-committal wording that the U.S. intelligence community "has not made any judgment that the information in this document is reliable, and we did not rely upon it in any way for our conclusions". This contradicted Trump's previous claim that Clapper had said the information in the dossier was false; Clapper's statement actually said the intelligence community had made no judgment on the truth of the information.

James Comey had disagreed with Clapper's wording, but Clapper's wording remained unchanged. Comey later told the Office of the Inspector General of his concerns at that time, because he believed the dossier to be more reliable than indicated in Clapper's non-committal statement:

Publication by BuzzFeed News and reactions 

On January 10, 2017, CNN reported that classified documents presented to Obama and Trump the previous week included allegations that Russian operatives possess "compromising personal and financial information" about Trump. CNN said it would not publish specific details on the reports because it had not "independently corroborated the specific allegations". Following the CNN report, BuzzFeed published a  draft dossier that it said was the basis for the briefing, including unverified claims that Russian operatives had collected "embarrassing material" involving Trump that could be used to blackmail him. BuzzFeed said the information included "specific, unverified, and potentially unverifiable allegations of contact between Trump aides and Russian operatives".

The New York Times commented: "Mr. Steele has made clear to associates that he always considered the dossier to be raw intelligence—not established facts, but a starting point for further investigation." Judge Craig Karsnitz described the purpose of the dossier: "An intelligence report is simply a report of information potentially relevant to an investigation. It can take many forms, be true or false, and can be used as opposition research and an intelligence report." Christopher Burrows, co-founder of Orbis Business Intelligence, does not consider it a "dossier", but "information that is referred to as 'raw intelligence' in intelligence circles.... a mixture of knowledge, rumor and hearsay.... [A]n intelligence agency would enrich the findings with data, test probabilities and write analyses. It's an elaborate process. But Steele is not an intelligence agency."

BuzzFeed's decision to publish the dossier was immediately criticized by many major media outlets for releasing the draft dossier without verifying its allegations.  Washington Post columnist Margaret Sullivan called it "scurrilous allegations dressed up as an intelligence report meant to damage Donald Trump", while The New York Times noted that the publication sparked a debate centering on the use of unsubstantiated information from anonymous sources. BuzzFeeds executive staff said the materials were newsworthy because they were "in wide circulation at the highest levels of American government and media" and argued that this justified public release. A judge in the Superior Court of the District of Columbia agreed with this reasoning when he threw out a libel suit against Steele and Orbis Business Intelligence.

Although the Columbia Journalism Review had originally (January 11, 2017) backed BuzzFeed's publication of the dossier, and editor Kyle Pope had tweeted his support of that decision, he later (November 17, 2021) described it as "a document that was never designed to meet the standards of good journalism", noting that its credibility had collapsed, and concluding that it was the source of "a lot of nonsense and misdirection" in subsequent media coverage and should not have been published at all. Sara Fischer, media reporter for Axios, was critical of the initial press coverage of the dossier before it had been adequately scrutinized.

The draft dossier's publication by BuzzFeed has always been defended by Jack Shafer, Politicos senior media writer, as well as by Richard Tofel of ProPublica and the Columbia Journalism Review. Shafer defended the public's right to know about the allegations against Trump, and saw a parallel in Judge Ungaro's ruling in the defamation suit filed by Aleksej Gubarev. Ungaro wrote that the "privilege exists to protect the media while they gather information needed for the public to exercise effective oversight of the government". She also noted that, before the FBI received any reports from Steele, they had "already opened a counterintelligence investigation into links between Russia and the Trump campaign".

In relation to a defamation lawsuit filed by Gubarev against BuzzFeed, regarding their publication of the draft dossier, Senior Master Barbara Fontaine said Steele was "in many respects in the same position as a whistle-blower" because of his actions "in sending part of the dossier to Senator John McCain and a senior government national security official, and in briefing sections of the US media". She said that "it was not known who provided the dossier to BuzzFeed but Mr Steele's evidence was that he was 'horrified and remains horrified' that it was published at all, let alone without substantial redactions."

The founders of Fusion GPS felt so alarmed by what sources reported to Steele that they have defended the fact that they and Steele used intermediaries to pass dossier content to the authorities, but, regarding the publication by BuzzFeed, if it had been up to them, "Steele's reporting never would have seen the light of day." They were also alarmed that the leak of the draft dossier would endanger sources, and Glenn Simpson immediately phoned Ken Bensinger at BuzzFeed: "Take those fucking reports down right now! You are going to get people killed!"

Steele wrote:

Christopher Burrows said: "We didn't expect the findings on Russia to reach the public."

Format 

When BuzzFeed published the  dossier in January 2017, the individual reports were one to three pages long, numbered, and page numbers 1–35 had been handwritten at the bottom. All but one had a typed date at the bottom. Each of the first 16 reports (pre-election memoranda) was assigned a typed number in the heading between 80 and 135, but the numeric order didn't always match the chronological order. The 17th report, known as the "December memo", was numbered 166. Of the original reports numbered 1–166, only certain reports were used for the dossier, and it is unknown what happened with the content of the other reports: "For example, the first report is labeled as '080', with no indication given as to where the original 79 antecedents might have gone. The second report is then labeled '086', creating yet another mystery as to 81 through 85, and what content they might contain that would otherwise bolster or contextualize what came before or what follows."

Each report started with a page heading in the same style as the first one shown here:

Each report was in two parts, starting with a Summary section, followed by a Detail section. The Summary contained summary paragraphs based on numbered and expanded content and findings in the following Detail section.

Legal status and comparison to Trump Tower meeting 

The legal status of the dossier has been questioned, but, because of the legal difference between an "expenditure" by a campaign and a "contribution" to a campaign, it does not run afoul of Federal Election Commission laws (52 U.S. Code § 30121) forbidding foreign nationals from contributing to or aiding political campaigns, and that applies to any form of aid, not just cash donations. The dossier (prepared by a British citizen indirectly hired by the Clinton campaign and DNC) and the 2016 Trump Tower meeting (involving a direct offer of aid by the Russian government to the Trump campaign) are frequently contrasted and conflated in this regard.

Philip Bump has explained "why the Trump Tower meeting may have violated the law—and the Steele dossier likely didn't": "Hiring a foreign party to conduct research is very different, including in legal terms, than being given information by foreign actors seeking to influence the election. What's more, Trump's campaign did accept foreign assistance in 2016, as the investigation by special counsel Robert S. MuellerIII determined."

The Trump Tower meeting involved a voluntary offer of aid ("a campaign contribution") to the Trump campaign from the Russian government, and the offer was thus illegal to accept in any manner. Already before the meeting, the Trump campaign knew the source and purpose of the offer of aid, still welcomed the offer, successfully hid it for a year, and when the meeting was finally exposed, Trump issued a deceptive press release about it.

By contrast, Steele's work was a legal, declared, campaign expense and did not involve any voluntary offer of aid to the Clinton campaign from the Russian government. FEC law allows such declared campaign expenditures, even if the aid is performed by foreigners.

Bump explains that:

Steven L. Hall, former CIA chief of Russia operations, has contrasted Steele's methods with those of Donald Trump Jr., who sought information from a Russian attorney at a meeting in Trump Tower in June 2016: "The distinction: Steele spied against Russia to get info Russia did not want released; Don Jr took a mtg to get info Russians wanted to give."

Jane Mayer referred to the same meeting and contrasted the difference in reactions to Russian attempts to support Trump: When Trump Jr. was offered "dirt" on Clinton as "part of Russia and its government's support for Mr. Trump", instead of "going to the F.B.I., as Steele had" when he learned Russia was helping Trump, Trump's son accepted the support by responding: "If it's what you say, I love it..."

Legacy 

Glenn Simpson believes the dossier interrupted a planned renewal of relationships between the United States and Russia that was "not in the interest of the United States"; that it supported the existing FBI investigation into Russian interference; and that it furthered understanding of the hidden relationship between the Russian government and the Trump campaign. Jane Mayer believes the dossier is "perhaps the most controversial opposition research ever to emerge from a Presidential campaign", and Julian Borger described it as "one of the most explosive documents in modern political history...".

T.A. Frank has described the dossier as a "case study" in media manipulation. In his 2021 book Spooked: The Trump Dossier, Black Cube, and the Rise of Private Spies, former New York Times journalist Barry Meier commented: "...media organizations didn't conduct internal postmortems or public reconstructions about how they handle the dossier story [because] it would have required them to disclose the toxic relationship that had developed between journalists and private spies."

Political journalist David Corn of the progressive magazine Mother Jones described the dossier as "a convenient foil, their false flag" for the "Trump gang":

Authorship and sources 

The dossier is based on information from witting and unwitting anonymous sources known to counterintelligence specialist Christopher Steele. Some were later revealed.

Christopher Steele 

When CNN reported the existence of the dossier on January 10, 2017, it did not name the author of the dossier, but revealed that he was British. Steele concluded that his anonymity had been "fatally compromised", and, realizing it was "only a matter of time until his name became public knowledge", fled into hiding with his family in fear of "a prompt and potentially dangerous backlash against him from Moscow". His friends later reported that he feared assassination by Russians. The Wall Street Journal revealed Steele's name the next day, on January 11. Orbis Business Intelligence Ltd, for whom Steele worked at the time the dossier was authored, and its director Christopher Burrows, a counterterrorism specialist, would not confirm or deny that Orbis had produced the dossier. On March 7, 2017, as some members of the U.S. Congress were expressing interest in meeting with or hearing testimony from Steele, he reemerged after weeks in hiding, appearing publicly on camera and stating, "I'm really pleased to be back here working again at the Orbis's offices in London today."

Called by the media a "highly regarded Kremlin expert" and "one of MI6's greatest Russia specialists", Steele formerly worked for the British intelligence agency MI6 for 22 years, including four years at the British embassy in Moscow, and headed MI6's Russia Desk for three years at the end of his MI6 career. He entered MI6 in 1987, directly after his graduation from Cambridge University. He currently works for Orbis Business Intelligence Ltd, a private intelligence company he co-founded in London.

Sir Andrew Wood, the former British ambassador to Moscow, has vouched for Steele's reputation. He views Steele as a "very competent professional operator... I take the report seriously. I don't think it's totally implausible." He also said "the report's key allegation—that Trump and Russia's leadership were communicating via secret back channels during the presidential campaign—was eminently plausible". FBI investigators reportedly treat Steele "as a peer", whose experience as a trusted Russia expert has included assisting the Justice Department, British prime ministers, and at least one U.S. president.

Steele's biases and motivations toward Trump appear to have changed over time. Starting in 2007, many years before he started his opposition research on Trump, he repeatedly met Ivanka Trump over several years, had a "friendly relationship" with her, and was "favorably disposed" to the Trump family. They even discussed the possibility of the Trump Organization using the services of Orbis Business Intelligence, but no arrangements were made. Simpson has also confirmed that "there was no pre-existing animus toward Trump by Steele or Fusion".

Later, as Steele was preparing the dossier before the 2016 election, Bruce Ohr said Steele told him he "was desperate that Donald Trump not get elected and was passionate about him not being president" (a quote disputed by Steele), attitudes that have been described by Julian Sanchez as "entirely natural, not suggestive of preexisting bias", considering Steele believed his own reporting. Steele has disputed Ohr's statement, and he told interviewers for Inspector General Horowitz that Ohr's wording was a paraphrase of his sentiments and not an exact quote, and the IG Report continues: "Steele told us that based on what he learned during his research he was concerned that Trump was a national security risk and he had no particular animus against Trump otherwise." Steele told the FBI that he "did not begin his investigation with any bias against Trump, but based on the information he learned during the investigation became very concerned about the consequences of a Trump presidency."

Steele first became a confidential human source (CHS) for the FBI in 2013 in connection with the investigation in the 2015 FIFA corruption case, but he considered the relationship as contractual. He said the relationship "was never really resolved and both sides turned a blind eye to it. It was not really ideal." Later, the Inspector General report on the Crossfire Hurricane investigation discusses "divergent expectations about Steele's conduct in connection with his election reporting", as Steele considered his first duty to his paying clients, and not to the FBI. The Inspector General's report states that "Steele contends that he was never a CHS for the FBI but rather that his consulting firm had a contractual relationship with the FBI." Steele said "he never recalled being told that he was a CHS and that he never would have accepted such an arrangement,..." This divergence in expectations was a factor that "ultimately resulted in the FBI formally closing Steele as a CHS in November 2016 (although... the FBI continued its relationship with Steele through Ohr)."

On May 3, 2021, The Daily Telegraph reported that Steele and Orbis Business Intelligence, using new sources not used for the original dossier, continued to supply the FBI with raw intelligence during the Trump presidency. During an interview with the FBI in September 2017, Steele informed the FBI that Orbis had "four discrete, 'hermetically-sealed' main agent networks". His Primary sub-source for the dossier was no longer "active" at the time of the interview with FBI agents, but that another "main agent network is up and running and is now starting to get good information". This resulted in "a second dossier for the FBI on Donald Trump". It included further claims of Russian election meddling; "alleged Russian interference linked to Mr Trump and his associates"; claims about the "existence of further sex tapes"; and "further details of Mr Manafort's alleged Russian contacts".

Steele's sources 

The Inspector General's report stated that "Steele himself was not the originating source of any of the factual information in his reporting." Instead, the report found that Steele relied on a "Primary Sub-source", later revealed as Igor Danchenko, who "used a network of [further] sub-sources to gather the information that was relayed to Steele".

In an Alfa-Bank lawsuit, Steele revealed that he "did not rely on Danchenko alone, instead obtaining information from "one main source and a couple of subsidiary sources". According to Steele: "The dossier was  intelligence obtained from 3 sources and approximately 20 sub-sources."

BBC correspondent Paul Wood, writing in The Spectator, wrote: "Steele had '20 to 30' sources for the dossier and in two decades as a professional intelligence officer he had never seen such complete agreement by such a wide range of sources."

Simpson has said that, to his knowledge, Steele did not pay any of his sources. According to investigative reporter Jane Mayer of The New Yorker, Orbis has a large number of paid "collectors" (also called subsources) whose information came from a network of often unwitting sub-subsources. Since payment of these sub-subsources can be seen as bribery or might encourage exaggeration, they are unpaid. Steele testified that these sub-subsources "were not paid and were not aware that their information was being passed to Orbis or Fusion GPS".

According to British journalist Luke Harding, Steele's sources were not new, but trusted, proven, and familiar sources. Howard Blum said Steele leaned on sources "whose loyalty and information he had bought and paid for over the years". Steele later informed the Inspector General's investigators that "this source network did not involve sources from his time as a [redacted] and was developed entirely in the period after he retired from government service."

Igor Danchenko 

In January 2017, the Primary Sub-source, later identified as Ukrainian-born and Russian-trained attorney Igor Danchenko, was contacted by the FBI for an interview. About a week and a half later, in exchange for legal immunity, he agreed to answer questions about his working relationship with Steele, as well as his opinion on the accuracy of the Steele dossier. He was interviewed for three days by the FBI and said that Steele misstated or exaggerated certain information. Danchenko has said "he did not know who Mr. Steele's client was at the time and considered himself a nonpartisan analyst and researcher".

The FBI found that he was "truthful and cooperative", but the FBI's Supervisory Intel Analyst said that "it was his impression that the Primary Sub-source may not have been 'completely truthful' and may have been minimizing certain aspects of what he/she told Steele". He also "believed that there were instances where the Primary Sub-source was 'minimizing' certain facts but did not believe that he/she was 'completely fabricating' events". He added that he "did not know whether he could support a 'blanket statement' that the Primary Sub-source had been truthful". Starting in March 2017, Danchenko became a paid confidential human source for the FBI. During this time he lied to the FBI several times during interviews and was terminated in October 2020.

In July 2020, Danchenko was unmasked after declassification of the interview report by Attorney General William P. Barr, who "has repeatedly been accused of abusing his powers to help Mr. Trump politically". Lindsey Graham had also "asked the F.B.I. to declassify the interview report". Immediately after Barr's unmasking of Danchenko, Graham posted it to the Senate Judiciary Committee's web site. The declassification order was criticized by former law enforcement officials as an unmasking that could endanger other sources and make the FBI's work harder. About two weeks after he was unmasked, Danchenko received a subpoena from Alfa-Bank, and his lawyer revealed that his client "fears for his life", since Russian agents are known to kill such informers.

Information about Danchenko's network of sources was provided to the FISA court:

The outing of Danchenko also brought to light an inaccuracy in the dossier that describes him as a "Russian-based" source. In fact, although he traveled to Russia in 2016 to gather information, and his source network is mostly in Russia, he is a Ukrainian-born and Russian-trained lawyer, researcher, and expert in Russian politics who lives in the United States.

Danchenko has defended his sources: "I have a longstanding relationship with most of my sources ... and have no reason to believe that any of them fabricated information that was given to me. More importantly, I have yet to see anything credible that indicates that the raw intelligence I collected was inaccurate."

Arrest and indictment 

On November 4, 2021, Danchenko was arrested and charged with five counts of making false statements to the FBI on five separate occasions regarding the sources of material he provided for the Steele dossier. These included Danchenko having allegedly obscured his relationship with Charles Dolan Jr. and having allegedly fabricated contacts with Sergei Millian. In November 2021, CNN's Marshall Cohen stated that recent "revelations about Dolan, Millian and Galkina raise grave questions about where Danchenko got his information, or if he perhaps made some of it up". On October 14, 2022, the judge dropped one charge, and four days later, Danchenko was acquitted of the other four charges.

Right-wing columnist and attorney Andrew C. McCarthy reacted to what he described as the "if not irrational, then exaggerated" reactions by Trump supporters to these reports of arrests. He urged them to be cautious as John Durham's "indictments narrowly allege that the defendants lied to the FBI only about the identity or status of people from whom they were getting information, not about the information itself."

Value as FBI source 

During his trial, two FBI officials revealed that Danchenko was "an uncommonly valuable" confidential human source for several years whose role went far beyond the Steele dossier:

Olga Galkina 

Olga Galkina, labeled by the FBI as "Source 3", was alleged to be an unwitting sub-source in Danchenko's network of sources and "stood as the dossier's most important contributor". She is an old friend of Danchenko and a middle school classmate. On October 28, 2020, The Wall Street Journal described her as a Russian public-relations executive with many past jobs in government and the private sector that enabled her to build a "vast network" of sources.

Galkina stated in an affidavit that "she had no idea Danchenko had used 'private discussions or private communications' as dossier material. 'I believe that Mr. Danchenko identified me as Sub-Source 3 to create more authoritativeness for his work'."

According to the Wall Street Journal, she was Steele's source for the hacking accusations against Webzilla, and the source of the allegations about a secret meeting in Prague involving Michael Cohen and three colleagues.

Sergei Millian 

Sergei Millian was alleged to be an unwitting sub-source in Danchenko's network of sources. He was described in the IG Report as sources D and E, and "Person 1". As an unwitting source, he was alleged to have confided in a compatriot, who then passed that information on to Steele. That information was used in Reports 80, 95, and 102. He denies being a dossier source. Although Steele told the FBI that Person 1 was a "boaster" and "egoist" who "may engage in some embellishment", the FBI omitted these "caveats about his source" from the FISA application.

In November 2021, Millian's alleged involvement as a source was brought into question. Igor Danchenko is alleged to have lied to Steele about Millian's involvement: "Danchenko told the FBI that he knew Steele believed that he had direct contact with Millian and that he 'never corrected' Steele about that 'erroneous belief'." On November 12, 2021, following the November 4 indictment of Igor Danchenko, The Washington Post corrected and removed the "parts of two stories regarding the Steele dossier" that identified Millian as a source. CNN reported that "Millian has since said he was 'framed' by Danchenko and has publicly denied that they ever spoke, though there is no indication in the indictment that Millian ever denied it to the FBI or under oath." In October 2022, judge Anthony Trenga cast doubt on Millian and two 2020 emails he wrote denying he talked to Danchenko: The "emails lack the necessary 'guarantees of trustworthiness' as the government does not offer direct evidence that Millian actually wrote the emails, and, even if he did, Millian possessed opportunity and motive to fabricate and/or misrepresent his thoughts."

Charles Dolan Jr. 

Dolan, who was "well-known among Russia experts," was another unwitting source for Danchenko. He was a public relations executive and Democratic party operative who had been active in Bill and Hillary Clinton's campaigns. While working for Ketchum, a PR firm in New York, he "helped handle global public relations for the Russian Federation for eight years ending in 2014". He also became acquainted with Danchenko and allegedly "fed the dossier before he fought against it". Danchenko had also introduced Olga Galkina, another one of Danchenko's sources, to him. The two had regular interactions "including in ways that indicated they supported Mrs. Clinton's campaign".

Dolan's involvement as an unwitting source for Danchenko came to light in connection with Danchenko's indictment. Danchenko is accused of lying to the FBI by stating that "he did not discuss information in the dossier with the individual" [Dolan], "when in fact, the indictment claims, some of the material was 'gathered directly' from" him.

Information allegedly from Dolan that ended up in the dossier were "rumors about Paul Manafort's dismissal as Trump's campaign chairman...Two days later, the indictment alleges, that information appeared in one of Steele's reports." Both men had also met in Moscow in June 2016, where Dolan had stayed at the Ritz-Carlton Hotel and toured the presidential suite where Trump had stayed in 2013. According to the Danchenko indictment, "a hotel staff member told [Dolan] that Mr. Trump had stayed there — but Mr. Dolan and another person on the tour told the F.B.I. that the staff member did not mention any salacious activity." After meeting in Moscow, Danchenko flew "to London to provide information that would later appear in the dossier, the indictment claims, setting forth the timeline of these encounters without stating that Dolan was the source for specific claims about the purported tape."

Dolan later stated "that he believed the analyst [Danchenko] 'worked for FSB'... Dolan later admitted to the FBI... that he had 'fabricated' the basis of certain details he had provided to Danchenko. He also reportedly said he was unaware of the specifics of Danchenko's work, or that the information they were trading would be transmitted to the FBI. Dolan's 'historical and ongoing involvement in Democratic politics,' the indictment asserts, 'bore upon' his 'reliability, motivations, and potential bias as a source of information' for Steele’s reports."

Dolan told authorities that Clinton campaign officials "did not direct, and were not aware of" his contacts with Danchenko. Journalist Stanley-Becker stated "new allegations make Dolan one of the most mysterious figures in the saga of the Steele dossier".

Discrepancies between sources and their allegations 

One of the findings of the 2019 Inspector General's report related to conflicting accounts of sourced content in the dossier. When Steele's Primary Sub-source was later interviewed by the FBI about the allegations sourced to them, he gave accounts that conflicted with Steele's renderings in the dossier and implied that Steele "misstated or exaggerated" their statements. FBI agent Peter Strzok wrote that "Recent interviews and investigation, however, reveal Steele may not be in a position to judge the reliability of his subsource network."

The IG found it difficult to discern the causes for the discrepancies between some allegations and explanations later provided to the FBI by the sources for those allegations. The IG attributed the discrepancies to three possible factors:

Another factor was attempts by sources to distance themselves from the content attributed to them:

The Supervisory Intel Analyst believed this key sub-source (not the Primary Sub-source) "may have been attempting to minimize his/her role in the [dossier's] election reporting following its release to the public".

The FBI's Supervisory Intel Analyst said that "it was his impression that the Primary Sub-source may not have been 'completely truthful' and may have been minimizing certain aspects of what he/she told Steele". He also "believed that there were instances where the Primary Sub-source was 'minimizing' certain facts but did not believe that he/she was 'completely fabricating' events". He added that he "did not know whether he could support a 'blanket statement' that the Primary Sub-source had been truthful".

On October 17, 2021, in Steele's first major interview with ABC News, George Stephanopoulos asked why Danchenko, the Primary Sub-source, told the FBI that he "felt that the tenor of Steele's reports was far more 'conclusive' than was justified," and that much of the information he had provided -- including word of the purported 'pee tape' -- came from 'word of mouth and hearsay ... conversation that [he/she] had with friends over beers,' and was likely 'made in jest'. Steele said he "may have 'taken fright' at having his cover blown and tried to 'downplay and underestimate' his own reporting when he spoke to the FBI."

Risk of contamination with Russian disinformation considered 

The dossier has been attacked by Trump supporters, especially Senators Chuck Grassley and Ron Johnson, with claims it contained Russian disinformation. The IG report describes how the FBI examined and rejected these claims. Under the heading "Crossfire Hurricane Team's Assessment of Potential Russian Influence on the Steele Election Reporting," the Inspector General's investigative team examined how seriously the FBI Crossfire Hurricane team had considered "whether Steele's election reports, or aspects of them, were the product of a Russian disinformation campaign".

Senators Grassley and Johnson alleged that some previously redacted footnotes in the IG report were a "bombshell": "According to their April 10 press release, the footnotes 'confirmed' that the Steele dossier, parts of which the FBI relied on to target Page, was the product of a Russian disinformation campaign." Later press releases were toned down and did not repeat the exact claims. Legal experts at Lawfare examined the unredacted footnotes and pushed back against these claims:

 

LawFare includes a direct quote from a footnote affirming that, as of June 2017, the FBI had no evidence that Steele's network had been "penetrated or compromised":

Lawfare rejected the two Senators' claims: "The new information in the two footnotes does not support the senators' initial claim that the footnotes confirm the existence of a Russian operation to disrupt the FBI's investigation. The footnotes only establish that the FBI received certain reports. The veracity of the information also remains unconfirmed."

It is a fact that Steele and Oleg Deripaska ("Russian Oligarch 1") have had dealings with each other. While he was working for a law firm hired by Deripaska to track down money allegedly stolen from him by Paul Manafort, Steele was also working between 2014 and 2016 with the FBI and Justice Department in an unsuccessful classified effort to flip Deripaska so he could be an FBI informant. This Deripaska/Steele association has been touted as a means whereby the Russians could get disinformation inserted into the dossier. The FBI rejected this theory as Priestap found it implausible. The IG report stated:

Bill Priestap further explained that "the Russians ... favored Trump, they're trying to denigrate Clinton ... [and] I don't know why you'd run a disinformation campaign to denigrate Trump on the side."

The IG Report said Steele explained how sophisticated the Russians were at planting and controlling misinformation, but Steele "had no evidence that his reporting was 'polluted' with Russian disinformation". The inspector general's report ultimately concluded "that more should have been done to examine Steele's contacts with intermediaries of Russian oligarchs in order to assess those contacts as potential sources of disinformation that could have influenced Steele's reporting".

In 2019, during Trump's first impeachment inquiry, national security expert Fiona Hill stated Steele may have been "played" by the Russians to spread disinformation.

Allegations 

The veracity of allegations can vary widely, with some allegations publicly confirmed, others unconfirmed, but, according to James Clapper and Fox News host Shepard Smith, none are disproven.

Trump and Putin have repeatedly denied the allegations, and Trump has labeled the dossier "discredited", "debunked", "fictitious", and "fake news".

Below, the allegations are simply presented as they are, but in the section after this one, the widely varying verification status for a number of allegations is examined, sometimes with conflicting reports for or against their veracity, including whether some sources have rejected them.

Each allegation should be read as "Sources allege... that (and then the allegation).

Cultivation of Trump 

 ... that "Russian authorities" had cultivated Trump "for at least 5years", and that the operation was "supported and directed" by Putin. (Report 80)
 ... that the Russian government's support for Trump was originally conducted by the Ministry of Foreign Affairs, then by the Federal Security Service (FSB), and was eventually directly handled by the Russian presidency because of its "growing significance over time". (Report 130)

The dossier describes two different Russian operations. The first was an attempt, lasting many years, to find ways to influence Trump, probably not so much "to make Mr. Trump a knowing agent of Russia", but most likely to make him a source the Russians could use. This operation utilized kompromat (Russian: short for "compromising material") and proposals of business deals. The second operation was very recent and involved contacts with Trump's representatives during the campaign to discuss the hacking of the DNC and Podesta.

Conspiracy, co-operation, and back channel communication 

 ... that there was an extensive and "well-developed conspiracy of co-operation between [the Trump campaign] and the Russian leadership", with information willingly exchanged in both directions. That this co-operation was "sanctioned at the 'highest level' and involved Russian diplomatic staff based in the US". That the Trump campaign used "moles within DNC as well as hackers in the US and Russia". (Report 95)
 ... that Trump had "so far declined various sweetener real estate business deals", but had "accepted a regular flow of intelligence from the Kremlin", notably on his political rivals. (Report 80)
 ... that Trump associates had established "an intelligence exchange [with the Kremlin] for at least 8years". That Trump and his team had delivered "intelligence on the activities, business and otherwise, in the US of leading Russian oligarchs and their families", as requested by Putin. (Report 97)

Why Russia supports Trump 

 ... that a major goal of the Russians in supporting Trump was "to upset the liberal international status quo, including on Ukraine-related sanctions, which was seriously disadvantaging the country". (Report 130)
 ... that Putin aimed to spread "discord and disunity" within the United States and between Western allies, whom he saw as a threat to Russia's interests. (Report 80)
 ... that "TRUMP was viewed as divisive in disrupting the whole US political system; anti-Establishment; and a pragmatist with whom they could do business." That Trump would remain a divisive force even if not elected. (Report 130)

Changing relationships 
 ... that "there had been talk in the Kremlin of TRUMP being forced to withdraw from the presidential race altogether as a result of recent events, ostensibly on grounds of his state and unsuitability for high office." (Report 100)
 ... that the Trump camp became angry and resentful toward Putin when they realized he not only was aiming to weaken Clinton and bolster Trump, but was attempting to "undermine the US government and democratic system more generally". (Report 102)

Kompromat and blackmail: Trump 

 ... that Trump "hated" Obama so much that when he stayed in the Presidential suite of the Ritz-Carlton Hotel in Moscow, he employed "a number of prostitutes to perform a 'golden showers' (urination) show in front of him" in order to defile the bed used by the Obamas on an earlier visit. The alleged incident from 2013 was reportedly filmed and recorded by the FSB as kompromat. (Report 80)
 ... that Trump was vulnerable to blackmail from Russian authorities for paying bribes and engaging in unorthodox and embarrassing sexual behavior over the years, and that the authorities were "able to blackmail him if they so wished". (Reports 80, 95, 97, 113)
 ... that the Kremlin had promised Trump they would not use the kompromat collected against him "as leverage, given high levels of voluntary co-operation forthcoming from his team". (Report 97)
 ... that Trump had explored the real estate sectors in St. Petersburg and Moscow, "but in the end TRUMP had had to settle for the use of extensive sexual services there from local prostitutes rather than business success". (Report 95)
 ... that witnesses to his "sex parties in the city" had been "'silenced' i.e. bribed or coerced to disappear." (Report 113)
 ... that Trump had paid bribes in St. Petersburg "to further his [business] interests". (Report 113)
 ... that Aras Agalarov "would know most of the details of what the Republican presidential candidate had got up to" in St. Petersburg. (Report 113)
 ... that Trump associates did not fear "the negative media publicity surrounding alleged Russian interference", because it distracted attention from his "business dealings in China and other emerging markets" involving "large bribes and kickbacks" that could be devastating if revealed. (Report 95)

Kompromat: Clinton 

 ... that Putin ordered the maintenance of a secret dossier on Hillary Clinton, with content dating back to the time of her husband's presidency. The dossier comprised eavesdropped conversations, either from bugging devices or from phone intercepts; it did not contain "details/evidence of unorthodox or embarrassing behavior", but focused more on "things she had said which contradicted her current positions on various issues". (Report 80)
 ... that the Clinton dossier had been collated by the FSB and was managed by Dmitry Peskov, Putin's press secretary. (Report 80)

Kremlin pro-Trump and anti-Clinton 

 ... that Putin feared and hated Hillary Clinton. (Report 95)
 ... that there was a "Kremlin campaign to aid TRUMP and damage CLINTON". (Reports 95, 100)
 ... that Putin's interference operation had an "objective of weakening CLINTON and bolstering TRUMP". (Report 102)

Key roles of Manafort, Cohen, and Page 

 ... that then-Trump campaign manager Paul Manafort had "managed" a "well-developed conspiracy of co-operation between [the Trump campaign] and the Russian leadership", and that he used Trump's foreign policy advisor, Carter Page, and others, "as intermediaries". (Report 95)
 ... that Page had "conceived and promoted" the timing of the release of hacked emails by WikiLeaks for the purpose of swinging supporters of Bernie Sanders "away from Hillary CLINTON and across to TRUMP". (Reports 95, 102)
 ... that Page was informed by Igor Divyekin, a senior Kremlin Internal Affairs official, "that the Russians had kompromat on Clinton and Trump, and allegedly added that Trump 'should bear this in mind'." (Report 94)
 ... that Cohen played a "key role" in the Trump–Russia relationship by maintaining a "covert relationship with Russia", arranging cover-ups and "deniable cash payments", and that his role had grown after Manafort had left the campaign. (Reports 134, 135, 136, 166)
 ... that "COHEN now was heavily engaged in a cover up and damage limitation operation in the attempt to prevent the full details of TRUMP's relationship with Russia being exposed." (Report 135)

DNC email hack, leaks, and misinformation 

 ... that Russia was responsible for the DNC email hacks and the recent appearance of the stolen DNC emails on WikiLeaks, and that the reason for using WikiLeaks was "plausible deniability". (Report 95)
 ... that "the operation had been conducted with the full knowledge and support of TRUMP and senior members of his campaign team". (Report 95)
 ... that after the emails had been forwarded to WikiLeaks, it was decided to not leak more, but to engage in misinformation: "Rather the tactics would be to spread rumours and misinformation about the content of what already had been leaked and make up new content." (Report 101)
 ... that Page had "conceived and promoted" the idea of [the Russians] leaking the stolen DNC emails to WikiLeaks during the 2016 Democratic National Convention. (Reports 95, 102)
 ... that Page had intended the email leaks "to swing supporters of Bernie SANDERS away from Hillary CLINTON and across to TRUMP". (Report 102)
 ... that the hacking of the DNC servers was performed by Romanian hackers ultimately controlled by Putin and paid by both Trump and Putin. (Report 166)
 ... that Cohen, together with three colleagues, secretly met with Kremlin officials in the Prague offices of Rossotrudnichestvo in August 2016, where he arranged "deniable cash payments" to the hackers and sought "to cover up all traces of the hacking operation", as well as "cover up ties between Trump and Russia, including Manafort's involvement in Ukraine". (Reports 135, 166)

Kickbacks and quid pro quo agreements to lift sanctions 

 ... that Viktor Yanukovych, the former pro-Russian President of Ukraine, had told Putin he had been making supposedly untraceable kickback payments to Manafort while he was Trump's campaign manager. (Report 105)
 ... that in return for Russia's leaking the stolen documents to WikiLeaks, "the TRUMP team had agreed to sideline Russian intervention in Ukraine as a campaign issue and to raise US/NATO defense commitments in the Baltics and Eastern Europe to deflect attention away from Ukraine, a priority for PUTIN who needed to cauterise the subject." (Report 95)
 ... that Page had secretly met Rosneft chairman Igor Sechin in Moscow on "either 7or 8July", together with a "senior Kremlin Internal Affairs official, DIVYEKIN". (Reports 95, 135, 166)
 ... that Sechin "offered PAGE/TRUMP's associates the brokerage of up to a 19 per cent (privatised) stake in Rosneft" (worth about $11billion) in exchange for Trump lifting the sanctions against Russia after his election. (Reports 94, 166)

Cultivation of various U.S. political figures 
 ... that the Kremlin had support(ed) "various US political figures, including funding indirectly their recent visits to Moscow. [The source] named a delegation from Lyndon LAROUCHE; presidential candidate Jill STEIN of the Green Party; TRUMP foreign policy adviser Carter PAGE; and former DIA Director Michael Flynn, in this regard as successful in terms of perceived outcomes." (Report 101)

Russian spy withdrawn 

 ... that Russia had hastily withdrawn from Washington their diplomat Mikhail Kalugin (misspelled as "Kulagin"), whose prominent role in the interference operation should remain hidden. (Report 111)

Use of botnets and porn traffic by hackers 

 ... that Aleksej Gubarev's "XBT/Webzilla and its affiliates had been using botnets and porn traffic to transmit viruses, plant bugs, steal data and conduct 'altering operations' against the Democratic Party leadership" and that Gubarev had been coerced by the FSB and was a significant player. (Report 166)

Veracity and corroboration status of specific allegations 

Simpson has described his own and Steele's confidence in Steele's work: "Nothing that I have seen disproves anything in the dossier. Which isn't to say I think it's all true. I don't think Chris thinks it's all true, either. But there's a difference between things being fake or a hoax or a fraud or a lie and things being incorrect." Steele, the author of the dossier, said he believes that 70–90% of the dossier is accurate, although he gives the "golden showers" allegation a 50% chance of being true.

The Senate Intelligence Committee wrote that the FBI made "efforts to corroborate the information in the dossier memos, but the Committee found that attempt lacking in both thoroughness and rigor". The FBI stopped all efforts to corroborate the dossier in May 2017 when the Special Counsel's Office took over the Russia investigation.

The following content describes how some allegations have been corroborated, while others remain unverified, with sometimes conflicting reports for or against their veracity. In some cases there are discrepancies between sources and their allegations.

Cultivation of Trump through time 

Source(s) for Report 80 (June 2016) alleged that the Kremlin had been cultivating Trump for "at least five years".

Luke Harding writes that documents show Czechoslovakia spied on Trump during the 1970s and 1980s, when he was married to Ivana Trump, his Czechoslovakia-born first wife. Harding writes that the Czechoslovakian government spied on Trump because of his political ambitions and notability as a businessman. It is known that there were close ties between Czechoslovakia's StB and the USSR's KGB.

Harding also describes how, already since 1987, the Soviet Union was interested in Trump. In his book Collusion, Harding asserts that the "top level of the Soviet diplomatic service arranged his 1987 Moscow visit. With assistance from the KGB." Then-KGB head Vladimir Kryuchkov "wanted KGB staff abroad to recruit more Americans". Harding proceeds to describe the KGB's cultivation process, and posits that they may have opened a file on Trump as early as 1977, when he married Czech model Ivana Zelníčková; the Soviet spies may have closely observed and analyzed the couple from that time on.

Jonathan Chait has written that 1987 is a year where Russians courted and praised Trump when they invited him to consider building in Moscow. He then visited Moscow in July 1987, and was likely under surveillance, but he did not build anything.

Russian assistance to the Trump campaign 

On April 26, 2016, George Papadopoulos, a Trump campaign foreign policy advisor, held a breakfast meeting with Joseph Mifsud, a man described by James B. Comey as a "Russian agent". Mifsud, who claimed "substantial connections to Russian officials", said he had just returned from Moscow, where he learned the Russians had "dirt" on Clinton in the form of thousands of her emails. This occurred concurrently with the Hillary Clinton email controversy, but before the hacking of the DNC computers had become public knowledge.

Papadopoulos later bragged "that the Trump campaign was aware the Russian government had dirt on Hillary Clinton". According to John Sipher, "court papers show he was, indeed, told by a Russian agent that the Kremlin had derogatory information in the form of 'thousands of e-mails'."

Papadopoulos sent emails about Putin to at least seven Trump campaign officials. Trump national campaign co-chairman Sam Clovis encouraged Papadopoulos to fly to Russia and meet with agents of the Russian Foreign Ministry, who reportedly wanted to share "Clinton dirt" with the Trump campaign. When Donald Trump Jr. learned of the offer, he welcomed it by responding: "If it's what you say, I love it..." Later, on June 9, 2016, a meeting in Trump Tower was held, ostensibly for representatives from Russia to deliver that dirt on Clinton. Instead, the meeting was used to discuss lifting of the Magnitsky Act economic sanctions that had been imposed on Russia in 2012, a move favored by candidate Trump.

On January 6, 2017, the Office of the Director of National Intelligence (ODNI) released the intelligence community assessment of the Russian interference in the 2016 United States elections. It stated that Russian leadership favored Trump over Clinton, and that Putin personally ordered an "influence campaign" to harm Clinton's electoral chances and "undermine public faith in the US democratic process", as well as ordering cyber attacks on the Democratic and Republican parties. John Brennan and James Clapper testified to Congress that Steele's dossier played no role in the intelligence community assessment, testimony that was reaffirmed by an April 2020 Republican-led Senate Intelligence Committee report. The committee found that the Steele dossier was not used by the assessment to "support any of its analytic judgments". In a December 2020 interview with Chris Wallace of Fox News, Brennan said: "The Steele dossier was not used in any way to undergird the judgments that came out of the intelligence community assessment about the Russian actions in the 2016 election... There was so much other evidence and intelligence to support those judgments."

Newsweek said "the dossier's main finding, that Russia tried to prop up Trump over Clinton, was confirmed by" the ODNI assessment. ABC News stated that "some of the dossier's broad implications—particularly that Russian President Vladimir Putin launched an operation to boost Trump and sow discord within the U.S. and abroad—now ring true."

The Mueller Report backed "Steele's central claim that the Russians ran a 'sweeping and systematic' operation... to help Trump win". James Comey said:

Lawfare has noted that the "Mueller investigation has clearly produced public records that confirm pieces of the dossier. And even where the details are not exact, the general thrust of Steele's reporting seems credible in light of what we now know about extensive contacts between numerous individuals associated with the Trump campaign and Russian government officials."

In The New Yorker, Jane Mayer said the allegation that Trump was favored by the Kremlin, and that they offered Trump's campaign dirt on Clinton, has proven true. Mayer also wrote that the CIA had a Russian government official working as "a human source inside the Russian government during the campaign, who provided information that dovetailed with Steele's reporting about Russia's objective of electing Trump and Putin's direct involvement in the operation." The spy had access to Putin and could actually take pictures of documents on Putin's desk. Because of the dangers imposed by Trump's recent careless disclosures of classified information to Russian officials, the CIA feared their spy was in danger, so the government official and his family were discretely exfiltrated during a family vacation to Montenegro.

In February 2019, Michael Cohen implicated Trump before the U.S. Congress, writing that in late July 2016, Trump had knowledge that Roger Stone was communicating with WikiLeaks about releasing emails stolen from the DNC in 2016. Stone denied this and accused Cohen of lying to Congress. Stone was later convicted before being pardoned by Trump, and it was confirmed that Stone had been in contact with WikiLeaks.

At the Helsinki summit meeting in July 2018, Putin was asked if he had wanted Trump to win the 2016 election. He responded "Yes, I did. Yes, I did. Because he talked about bringing the U.S.-Russia relationship back to normal."

Manafort's and others' co-operation with Russian efforts 

Dossier source(s) allege that Manafort, who had worked for Russian interests in Ukraine for many years, "managed" a "well-developed conspiracy of co-operation between [the Trump campaign] and the Russian leadership". The "conspiracy" is not proven, but the "co-operation" is seen as proven.

While the Mueller investigation did not "produce enough evidence" to prove the existence of a formal written or oral "conspiracy", some consider the actions of Manafort, Trump's welcoming of Russian help, and the myriad secret contacts between other Trump campaign members and associates with Russians to be the alleged "co-operation" with the Russian's "'sweeping and systematic' operation in 2016 to help Trump win", that The Guardians Luke Harding and Dan Sabbagh describe as "Steele's central claim".

CNN described Manafort's role in its report of intercepted communications among "suspected Russian operatives discussing their efforts to work with Manafort... to coordinate information that could damage Hillary Clinton's election prospects... The suspected operatives relayed what they claimed were conversations with Manafort, encouraging help from the Russians."

These reported intercepts are considered "remarkably consistent with the raw intelligence in the Steele Dossier... [that] states that the 'well-developed conspiracy of co-operation between [the Trump campaign] and the Russian leadership... was managed on the TRUMP side by the Republican candidate's campaign manager, Paul MANAFORT'."

Russian conversations confirmed 

On February 10, 2017, CNN reported that "the dossier details about a dozen conversations between senior Russian officials and other Russian individuals", and that some of those communications had been "intercepted during routine intelligence gathering" and corroborated by U.S. investigators. They "took place between the same individuals on the same days and from the same locations as detailed in the dossier". Due to the classified status of intelligence collection programs, it was not revealed which of the specific conversations mentioned in the dossier were intercepted.

U.S. officials said the corroboration gave "US intelligence and law enforcement 'greater confidence' in the credibility of some aspects of the dossier as they continue to actively investigate its contents".

In January 2020, Erik Wemple, The Washington Posts media critic, criticized this February 2017 CNN report as "vague," asking "CNN to point us to any subsequent reporting—by special counsel Robert S. Mueller III, for instance, or the Horowitz report—that shores up the Sciutto-Perez story about confirmed communications from the dossier."

Kompromat and "golden showers" allegations 

Dossier source(s) allege that Trump "hated" Obama so much that when he stayed in the Presidential suite of the Ritz-Carlton Hotel in Moscow, he employed "a number of prostitutes to perform a 'golden showers' (urination) show in front of him" in order to defile the bed used by the Obamas on an earlier visit. The alleged incident from 2013 was reportedly filmed and recorded by the FSB as kompromat. The 2020 Senate Intelligence Committee report assessed the Ritz-Carlton Hotel in Moscow as a "high counterintelligence risk environment" with Russian intelligence on staff, "government surveillance of guests' rooms", and the common presence of prostitutes, "likely with at least the tacit approval of Russian authorities". A Marriott executive told the committee that after Trump's 2013 stay at the hotel, he overheard two hotel employees discussing what to do with an elevator surveillance video they said showed Trump "with several women" whom one of the employees "implied to be 'hostesses.'" Committee investigators interviewed the two employees, but they said they could not recall the video.

Thomas Roberts, the host of the Miss Universe contest, confirmed that "Trump was in Moscow for one full night and at least part of another. (November 8–10). According to flight records, Keith Schiller's testimony, social media posts, and Trump's close friend, Aras Agalarov, Trump arrived by private jet on Friday, November 8, going to the Ritz-Carlton hotel and booking into the presidential suite, where the "golden showers" incident is alleged to have occurred. The next day, Facebook posts showed he was at the Ritz-Carlton Hotel. That evening he attended the Miss Universe pageant, followed by an after-party. He then returned to his hotel, packed, and flew back to the U.S.

James Comey wrote in his book A Higher Loyalty: Truth, Lies, and Leadership that Trump asked him to have the FBI investigate the pee tape allegation "because he wanted to convince his wife that it wasn't true". Comey did not know if the "golden showers" allegation was true, but he came to believe it was possible.

Regarding the "golden showers" allegation, Michael Isikoff and David Corn have stated that Steele's "faith in the sensational sex claim would fade over time.... As for the likelihood of the claim that prostitutes had urinated in Trump's presence, Steele would say to colleagues, 'It's 50–50'." The book Russian Roulette says that Steele's confidence in the truth of "the Ritz-Carlton story was 'fifty-fifty'. He treated everything in the dossier as raw intelligence material—not proven fact." In their 2019 book, the founders of Fusion GPS report that Steele received the "hotel anecdote" from seven Russian sources.

Slate journalist Ashley Feinberg investigated a 25-second video of the purported occurrence (that she described as a 'pee tape'). She concluded that the tape was "fake", but it was "very far from being an obvious fake". A key "discrepancy", according to Feinberg, was that the video apparently showed the presidential suite at the Ritz-Carlton in Moscow as it appeared post-renovation in February 2016, despite the purported occurrence being in November 2013, before the renovation occurred. The video had been in circulation since at least January 25, 2019.

A footnote in the Mueller Report suggests that Trump may have heard that Russia had incriminating tapes of his behavior. On October 30, 2016, Michael Cohen exchanged a series of text messages with Giorgi Rtskhiladze, a businessman who had worked with Cohen on Trump's real estate projects. Rtskhiladze reported that he had successfully stopped the "flow of tapes from Russia but not sure if there's anything else. Just so you know..." Rtskhiladze told investigators that these were compromising tapes of Trump. Cohen told investigators he spoke to Trump about the issue. Rtskhiladze later told investigators "he was told the tapes were fake, but he did not communicate that to Cohen." Rolling Stone reported that "Rtskhiladze's description of the tapes' content tracks with the unverified information included in the Steele dossier".

The Senate Intelligence Committee Report indicated that "Cohen has testified that he became aware of allegations about a tape of compromising information in late 2013 or early 2014...related to Trump and prostitutes." Cohen then "asked a friend, Giorgi Rtskhiladze, to see if Rtskhiladze could find out if the tape was real". The Report added that "Cohen...would have been willing to pay...to suppress the information if it could be verified, but Cohen was never shown any evidence."

Role of Agalarovs 

On June 15, 2013, five months before the 2013 Miss Universe contest in Moscow, Trump was accompanied on a visit to the Las Vegas nightclub "The Act" by Crocus Group owner Aras Agalarov, his son Emin, Ike Kaveladze, Rob Goldstone, Michael Cohen, Keith Schiller, and others, where Trump was photographed and the group stayed "for several hours". The club featured "risque performances" and, according to Cohen, Trump watched a golden showers performance "with delight".

The Agalarovs were also linked to several other events involving Trump, including the invitation to share "dirt" on Clinton at the Trump Tower meeting and knowledge of Trump's alleged sexual activities in Russia, both in St. Petersburg and the Moscow Ritz Carlton. The dossier's sources reported that Aras Agalarov "would know most of the details of what the Republican presidential candidate had got up to" in St. Petersburg. In 2013, when Trump stayed at the Ritz Carlton hotel, "multiple sources" reported that the offer to "send five women to Trump's hotel room that night" came from a Russian who was accompanying Emin Agalarov". A footnote in the Mueller Report describes how Giorgi Rtskhiladze reported that he had successfully stopped the "flow of... compromising tapes of Trump rumored to be held by persons associated with the Russian real estate conglomerate Crocus Group" [owned by Agalarov].

On October 17, 2021, in Steele's first major interview with ABC News, George Stephanopoulos asked him if he thought the "pee tape" was real. Steele answered that it "probably does exist", but he "wouldn't put 100 percent certainty on it". When he was asked why the Russians hadn't released it, he replied "It hasn't needed to be released... I think the Russians felt they'd got pretty good value out of Donald Trump when he was president of the U.S."

Trump viewed as under Putin's influence 

Dossier source(s) allege that the Russians possess kompromat on Trump that can be used to blackmail him, and that the Kremlin promised him the kompromat will not be used as long as he continues his cooperation with them. Trump's actions at the Helsinki summit in 2018 "led many to conclude that Steele's report was more accurate than not.... Trump sided with the Russians over the U.S. intelligence community's assessment that Moscow had waged an all-out attack on the 2016 election... The joint news conference... cemented fears among some that Trump was in Putin's pocket and prompted bipartisan backlash."

At the joint press conference, when asked directly about the subject, Putin denied having any kompromat on Trump. Even though Trump was reportedly given a "gift from Putin" the weekend of the pageant, Putin argued "that he did not even know Trump was in Russia for the Miss Universe pageant in 2013 when, according to the Steele dossier, video of Trump was secretly recorded to blackmail him."

In reaction to Trump's actions at the summit, Senator Chuck Schumer (D-N.Y.) spoke in the Senate: "Millions of Americans will continue to wonder if the only possible explanation for this dangerous and inexplicable behavior is the possibility—the very real possibility—that President Putin holds damaging information over President Trump."

Several operatives and lawyers in the U.S. intelligence community reacted strongly to Trump's performance at the summit. They described it as "subservien[ce] to Putin" and a "fervent defense of Russia's military and cyber aggression around the world, and its violation of international law in Ukraine" which they saw as "harmful to US interests". They also suggested he was either a "Russian asset" or a "useful idiot" for Putin, and that he looked like "Putin's puppet". Former Director of National Intelligence James Clapper wondered "if Russians have something on Trump", and former CIA director John Brennan, who has accused Trump of "treason", tweeted: "He is wholly in the pocket of Putin."

Former acting CIA director Michael Morell has called Trump "an unwitting agent of the Russian federation", and former CIA director Michael V. Hayden said Trump was a "useful fool" who is "manipulated by Moscow". House Speaker Nancy Pelosi questioned Trump's loyalty when she asked him: "[Why do] all roads lead to Putin?"

According to former KGB major Yuri Shvets, Trump became the target of a joint Czech intelligence services and KGB spying operation after he married Czech model Ivana Zelnickova and was cultivated as an "asset" by Russian intelligence since 1977: "Russian intelligence gained an interest in Trump as far back as 1977, viewing Trump as an exploitable target."

Trump was not viewed as an actual agent (spy) but as an asset: "We're talking about Trump being a self-interested businessman who's happy to do a favour if it works to his own best interests."

Ynet, an Israeli online news site, reported on January 12, 2017, that U.S. intelligence advised Israeli intelligence officers to be cautious about sharing information with the incoming Trump administration, until the possibility of Russian influence over Trump, suggested by Steele's report, has been fully investigated.

Max Boot described what he sees as more "evidence of Trump's subservience to Putin", and he tied it to new government confirmations of rumors about Trump's alleged "dalliances with Russian women during visits to Moscow" that leave "him open to blackmail", rumors mentioned in the 2020 Senate Intelligence Committee report: While the Senate Intelligence Committee report extensively explored the possibility of Russian kompromat, much of the discussion was redacted in the public version of the report. Ultimately, the Senate Intelligence Committee "did not establish" that Russia had kompromat on Trump.

Kremlin's "Romanian" hackers and use of WikiLeaks, and Trump campaign reaction 

Dossier source(s) allege that "Romanian hackers" controlled by Putin hacked the DNC servers and that the Trump campaign cooperated with Russia.

Russian hackers used the Guccifer 2.0 persona and claimed to be Romanian, like the Romanian hacker who originally used that identity.

The Mueller Report confirmed that the dossier was correct that the Kremlin was behind the appearance of the DNC emails on WikiLeaks, noting that the Trump campaign "showed interest in WikiLeaks's releases of documents and welcomed their potential to damage candidate Clinton". It was later confirmed that Roger Stone was in contact with Wikileaks.

Thirteen Russian nationals and three companies have been charged for their efforts to interfere in the 2016 election and to support Trump's campaign. According to an indictment cited by The New York Times, "The Russians stole the identities of American citizens, posed as political activists and used the flash points of immigration, religion and race to manipulate a campaign in which those issues were already particularly divisive," beginning in 2014. By 2016, they were "supporting the presidential campaign of then-candidate Donald J. Trump" and denigrating Clinton, concluded the U.S. government.

According to CNN, "former top Trump campaign officials have corroborated special counsel Robert Mueller's finding that the Trump campaign planned some of its strategy around the Russian hacks, and had multiple contacts with Kremlin-linked individuals in 2016."

On February 19, 2020, numerous sources revealed that lawyers for WikiLeaks founder Julian Assange told Westminster Magistrates' Court Trump had Dana Rohrabacher visit Assange at the Ecuadoran Embassy in London on August 16, 2017. There, he made a quid pro quo offer of a presidential pardon to Assange, in exchange for Assange covering up Russian involvement by declaring that "Russia had nothing to do with the DNC leaks": "[Lawyer] Edward Fitzgerald... said he had evidence that a quid pro quo was put to Assange by Rohrabacher, who was known as Putin's favorite congressman."

Timing of release of hacked emails 

Dossier source(s) allege that Carter Page "conceived and promoted" the idea of [the Russians] leaking the stolen DNC emails to WikiLeaks during the 2016 Democratic National Convention for the purpose of swinging supporters of Bernie Sanders "away from Hillary CLINTON and across to TRUMP". (Reports 95, 102)

In July 2016, in an "error-ridden message", WikiLeaks urged Russian intelligence to act swiftly to reach this timeline goal:  The New York Times reported that Assange told Democracy Now! "he had timed their release to coincide with the Democratic convention".

The leaks started the day before the DNC national convention, a timing that was seen as suspicious by David Shedd, a former Director of the Defense Intelligence Agency, who said: "The release of emails just as the Democratic National Convention is getting underway this week has the hallmarks of a Russian active measures campaign."

Manafort and kickback payments from Yanukovych 

Dossier source(s) allege that Russia-friendly president Yanukovych, whom Manafort advised for over a decade, had told Putin he had been making supposedly untraceable kickback payments to Manafort. After Yanukovych fled to Russia in 2014 under accusations of corruption, a secret "black ledger" was found in the former Party of Regions headquarters. It showed that Yanukovych and his ruling political party had set aside $12.7 million in illegal and undisclosed payments to Manafort for his work from 2007 to 2012. Manafort has denied receiving the payments. Manafort was accused of receiving $750,000 in "illegal, off-the-books payments from Ukraine's pro-Russian President Viktor Yanukovych before he was toppled".

From 2006 to at least 2009, Manafort had a $10 million annual contract with Putin ally and aluminum magnate, Oleg Deripaska, a contract under which Manafort had proposed he would "influence politics, business dealings and news coverage inside the United States, Europe and former Soviet republics to benefit President Vladimir Putin's government".

Page met with Rosneft officials 

On November 2, 2017, Carter Page testified, without a lawyer, for more than six hours before the House Intelligence Committee that was investigating Russian interference in the 2016 U.S. elections. He testified about his five-day trip to Moscow in July 2016. According to his testimony, before leaving he informed Jeff Sessions, J. D. Gordon, Hope Hicks, and Corey Lewandowski, Trump's campaign manager, of the planned trip to Russia, and Lewandowski approved the trip, responding: "If you'd like to go on your own, not affiliated with the campaign, you know, that's fine."

Dossier source(s) allege that Page secretly met Rosneft chairman Igor Sechin on that July trip. Page denied meeting Sechin or any Russian officials during that trip, but he later admitted under oath that he met with Sechin's senior aide, Andrey Baranov, who was Rosneft's chief of investor relations. According to Harding, Baranov was "almost certainly" "relaying Sechin's wishes". David Corn and Michael Isikoff wrote that the FBI was not able to find evidence that Page met with Sechin or was offered a 19 percent stake in the giant energy conglomerate in exchange for the lifting of U.S. sanctions and that "Mueller's report noted that his 'activities in Russia ... were not fully explained'". Newsweek has listed the claim about Page meeting with Rosneft officials as "verified".

Jane Mayer said this part of the dossier seems true, even if the name of an official may have been wrong. Page's congressional testimony confirmed he met with Andrey Baranov, who was Rosneft's chief of investor relations, and Page conceded under questioning by Adam Schiff that the "potential sale of a significant percentage of Rosneft" might have been "briefly mentioned". However, Page insisted that "there was never any negotiations, or any quid pro quo, or any offer, or any request even, in any way related to sanctions".

CNN noted that his admissions to the House Intelligence Committee did confirm the Steele dossier was right about Page attending high-level meetings with Russians and possibly discussing "a sale of a stake in Rosneft", even though he denied doing so at the time. In April 2019, the Mueller Report concluded that their investigation did not establish that Page coordinated with Russia's interference efforts.

On February 11, 2021, Page lost a defamation suit he had filed against Yahoo! News and HuffPost for their articles that described his activities mentioned in the Steele dossier. According to Jeff Montgomery in Law360: "Judge Craig A Karsnitz ruled that the articles ... were either true or protected under Section 230 of the Communications Decency Act." Mike Leonard, writing for Bloomberg Law, wrote that the judge said that Page admitted the articles about his potential contacts with Russian officials were essentially true.

Brokerage of Rosneft privatization 

Dossier source(s) allege that Sechin "offered PAGE/TRUMP's associates the brokerage of up to a 19 per cent (privatised) stake in Rosneft" (worth about $11billion) in exchange for Trump lifting the sanctions against Russia after his election.

According to Harding, Sechin and Divyekin set this offer up as a carrot and stick scheme, in which the carrot was the brokerage fee ("in the region of tens and possibly hundreds of millions of dollars"), and the stick was blackmail over purported "damaging material on Trump" held by the Russian leadership.

About a month after Trump won the election, according to The Guardian, Carter Page traveled to Moscow "shortly before the company announced it was selling a 19.5% stake" in Rosneft. He met with top Russian officials at Rosneft, but denied meeting Sechin. He also complained about the effects of the sanctions against Russia.

On December 7, 2016, Putin announced that a 19.5% stake in Rosneft was sold to Glencore and a Qatar fund. Public records showed the ultimate owner included "a Cayman Islands company whose beneficial owners cannot be traced", with "the main question" being "Who is the real buyer of a 19.5 percent stake in Rosneft?... the Rosneft privatization uses a structure of shell companies owning shell companies."

Michael Horowitz's 2019 inspector general report "said Steele's claims about Page 'remained uncorroborated' when the wiretaps ended in 2017".

Trump's attempts to lift sanctions 

The dossier says Page, claiming to speak with Trump's authority, had confirmed that Trump would lift the existing sanctions against Russia if he were elected president. On December 29, 2016, during the transition period between the election and the inauguration, National Security Advisor designate Flynn spoke to Russian Ambassador Sergei Kislyak, urging him not to retaliate for newly imposed sanctions; the Russians took his advice and did not retaliate.

Within days after the inauguration, new Trump administration officials ordered State Department staffers to develop proposals for immediately revoking the economic and other sanctions. One retired diplomat later said, "What was troubling about these stories is that suddenly I was hearing that we were preparing to rescind sanctions in exchange for, well, nothing." The staffers alerted Congressional allies who took steps to codify the sanctions into law. The attempt to overturn the sanctions was abandoned after Flynn's conversation was revealed and Flynn resigned. In August 2017, Congress passed a bipartisan bill to impose new sanctions on Russia. Trump reluctantly signed the bill, but then refused to implement it. After Trump hired Manafort, his approach toward Ukraine changed; he said he might recognize Crimea as Russian territory and might lift the sanctions against Russia.

Among those sanctioned were Russian oligarchs like Oleg Deripaska, "who is linked to Paul Manafort", parliament member Konstantin Kosachev, banker Aleksandr Torshin, and Putin's son-in-law. Preparation for the sanctions started already before Trump took office. In January 2019, Trump's Treasury Department lifted the sanctions on companies formerly controlled by Deripaska. Sanctions on Deripaska himself remained in effect.

Cohen and alleged Prague visit 

Dossier source(s) allege that Cohen and three colleagues met Kremlin officials in the Prague offices of Rossotrudnichestvo in August 2016, to arrange for payments to the hackers, cover up the hack, and "cover up ties between Trump and Russia, including Manafort's involvement in Ukraine". McClatchy reported in 2018 that a phone of Cohen's was traced to the Prague area in late summer 2016. The April 2019 Mueller Report states "Cohen had never traveled to Prague". The December 2019 Horowitz Report stated that the FBI "concluded that these allegations against Cohen" in the dossier "were not true".

In April 2018, McClatchy DC Bureau, citing two sources, reported that investigators working for Mueller "have traced evidence that Cohen entered the Czech Republic through Germany, apparently during August or early September of 2016", a claim that The Spectator reported in July 2018 was "backed up by one intelligence source in London".

In August 2018, The Spectator reported that "one intelligence source" saying "Mueller is examining 'electronic records' that would place Cohen in Prague." In December 2018, McClatchy reported that a phone of Cohen's had "pinged" cellphone towers in the Prague area in late summer 2016, citing four sources, leading to foreign intelligence detecting the pings. McClatchy also reported that during that time an Eastern European intelligence agency had intercepted communications between Russians, one of whom mentioned that Cohen was in Prague.

The Washington Post sent a team of reporters to Prague in an attempt to verify that Cohen had been there for the purposes alleged in the Dossier. According to reporter Greg Miller in November 2018, they "came away empty".

In April 2019, The New York Times reported that when the FBI attempted to verify the dossier's claims, the Prague allegation "appeared to be false", as "Cohen's financial records and C.I.A. queries to foreign intelligence services revealed nothing to support it."

Also in April 2019, the Mueller Report mentioned that "Cohen had never traveled to Prague" and presented no evidence of the alleged Prague meeting, thus contradicting the dossier and the McClatchy report. Glenn Kessler, fact-checker for The Washington Post, has said that "Mueller does not indicate he investigated whether Cohen traveled to Prague; he simply dismisses the incident in Cohen's own words". McClatchy responded to the Mueller Report by stating that it did not refer to evidence that Cohen's phone had pinged in or near Prague. McClatchy stood by its December 2018 reporting, stating that there was a "possibility that Cohen was not there but one of the many phones he used was".

The Associated Press described a December 2019 Horowitz Report mention of an inaccuracy in the dossier regarding Michael Cohen that may have been the Prague allegation. Matt Taibbi wrote that news reports of the Cohen-Prague allegation were "either incorrect or lacking factual foundation". CNN interpreted the Horowitz Report as saying that the dossier's Cohen-Prague allegation was untrue.

In August 2020, the testimony of David Kramer was publicized, where he said Steele was uncertain about the "alleged Cohen trip to Prague". Kramer said: "it could have been in Prague, it could have been outside of Prague. He also thought there was a possibility it could have been in Budapest... [but Steele] never backed off the idea that Cohen was in Europe." In October 2021, "When asked why Cohen would not admit to the alleged meeting despite already being convicted of other crimes, Steele replied: 'I think it's so incriminating and demeaning. … And the other reason is he might be scared of the consequences'."

Republican position on Russian conflict with Ukraine and related sanctions 

In 2015, Trump had taken a hard line in favor of Ukraine's independence from Russia. He initially denounced Russia's annexation of Crimea as a "land grab" that "should never have happened", and called for a firmer U.S. response, saying "We should definitely be strong. We should definitely do sanctions."

With the hirings of Paul Manafort and Carter Page, Trump's approach toward Ukraine reversed. Manafort had worked for Russian interests in Ukraine for many years, and after hiring Manafort as his campaign manager, Trump said he might recognize Crimea as Russian territory and might lift the sanctions against Russia. At the time Trump appointed Carter Page as a foreign policy advisor, Page was known as an outspoken and strongly pro-Russian, anti-sanctions person whose views aligned with Trump's, and who had complained that his own, as well as his Russian friends', business interests were negatively affected by the sanctions imposed on Russia because of its aggression in Ukraine and its interference in the 2016 elections.

Dossier source(s) allege that "the Trump campaign agreed to minimize US opposition to Russia's incursions into Ukraine". Harding considers this allegation to have been confirmed by the actions of the Trump campaign: "This is precisely what happened at the Republican National Convention last July, when language on the US's commitment to Ukraine was mysteriously softened." The Washington Post reported that "the Trump campaign orchestrated a set of events" in July 2016 "to soften the language of an amendment to the Republican Party's draft policy on Ukraine." In July 2016, the Republican National Convention did make changes to the Republican Party's platform on Ukraine: initially the platform proposed providing "lethal weapons" to Ukraine, but the line was changed to "appropriate assistance".

NPR reported that "Diana Denman, a Republican delegate who supported arming U.S. allies in Ukraine, has told people that Trump aide J.D. Gordon said at the Republican Convention in 2016 that Trump directed him to support weakening that position in the official platform." J. D. Gordon, who was one of Trump's national security advisers during the campaign, said he had advocated for changing language because that reflected what Trump had said. Although the Trump team denied any role in softening the language, Denman confirmed that the change "definitely came from Trump staffers".

Kyle Cheney of Politico sees evidence that the change was "on the campaign's radar" because Carter Page congratulated campaign members in an email the day after the platform amendment: "As for the Ukraine amendment, excellent work." Paul Manafort falsely said that the change "absolutely did not come from the Trump campaign". Trump told George Stephanopoulos that people in his campaign were responsible for changing the GOP's platform stance on Ukraine, but he denied personal involvement.

Relations with Europe and NATO 

Dossier source(s) allege that, as part of a quid pro quo agreement, "the TRUMP team had agreed... to raise US/NATO defense commitments in the Baltics and Eastern Europe to deflect attention away from Ukraine, a priority for PUTIN who needed to cauterise the subject." Aiko Stevenson, writing in HuffPost, noted that some of Trump's actions seem to align with "Putin's wish list", that "includes lifting sanctions on Russia, turning a blind eye towards its aggressive efforts in the Ukraine, and creating a divisive rift amongst western allies." During the campaign Trump "called NATO, the centrepiece of Transatlantic security, 'obsolete', championed the disintegration of the EU, and said that he is open to lifting sanctions on Moscow." Harding adds that Trump repeatedly "questioned whether US allies were paying enough into Nato coffers". Jeff Stein, writing in Newsweek, described how "Trump's repeated attacks on NATO have... frustrated... allies... [and] raised questions as to whether the president has been duped into facilitating Putin's long-range objective of undermining the European Union." Trump's appearances at meetings with allies, including NATO and G7, have frequently been antagonistic; according to the Los Angeles Times, "The president's posture toward close allies has been increasingly and remarkably confrontational this year, especially in comparison to his more conciliatory approach to adversaries, including Russia and North Korea."

Spy withdrawn from Russian embassy 

Dossier source(s) allege that "a leading Russian diplomat, Mikhail KULAGIN" participated in U.S. election meddling, and was recalled to Moscow because the Kremlin was concerned his role in the meddling would be exposed. The BBC later reported that U.S. officials in 2016 had identified Russian diplomat Mikhail Kalugin as a spy and that he was under surveillance, thus "verifying" a key claim in the dossier. Kalugin was the head of the economics section at the Russian embassy. He returned to Russia in August 2016. McClatchy reported that the FBI was investigating whether Kalugin played a role in the election interference. Kalugin has denied the allegations.

Botnets and porn traffic by hackers 

The validity of the accusation that Aleksej Gubarev's "XBT/Webzilla and its affiliates had been using botnets and porn traffic to transmit viruses, plant bugs, steal data and conduct 'altering operations' against the Democratic Party leadership" has been confirmed by an unsealed report by FTI Consulting in the defamation suit(s) Gubarev had filed against others.

The report by FTI Consulting said:

Cyber security and intelligence expert Andrew Weisburd has said both Gubarev and the dossier "can be right": "Their explanation is entirely plausible, as is the Steele Dossier's description of Mr. Gubarev as essentially a victim of predatory officers of one or more Russian intelligence services.... Neither BuzzFeed nor Steele have accused Gubarev of being a willing participant in wrongdoing." XBT has denied the allegations, and "findings do not prove or disprove claims made about XBT in the dossier, but show how the company could have been used by cyber criminals, wittingly or unwittingly".

According to the Wall Street Journal, Steele's source for the hacking accusations against Webzilla was Olga Galkina, who was involved in a "messy dispute" with the firm "after being fired in November 2016".

Dossier's veracity and Steele's reputation 

Steele and the dossier became "the central point of contention in the political brawl raging around" the Special counsel investigation into Russian interference in the 2016 United States elections. Russian intelligence agencies may have sought to create doubt about the veracity of the dossier. Those who believed Steele considered him a hero who tried to warn about the Kremlin's meddling in the election, and people who distrusted him considered him a "hired gun" used to attack Trump. Glenn Kessler described the dossier as "a political Rorschach test. Depending on your perspective, it's either a hoax used to defame a future president or a credible guide to allegations about Trump's involvement with Russia." According to former New York Times reporter Barry Meier, some MI6 officials said that Steele "had a tendency to become obsessed and go down rabbit holes chasing targets of questionable value".

Following the dossier's release, Steele completely avoided on-camera interviews until he participated in an ABC News documentary that was aired on Hulu on October 18, 2021. In that documentary, Steele maintained that his sources were credible and that it was typical in intelligence investigations to "never get to the point where you're 99% certain of the evidence to secure a conviction". Steele also acknowledged that one of his sources had faced repercussions; he confirmed that the source was still alive, but he would not provide further details.

The dossier's "broad assertion that Russia waged a campaign to interfere in the election is now accepted as fact by the US intelligence community." With the passage of time and further revelations from various investigations and sources, it is becoming clearer that the overall thrust of the dossier was accurate:

Shepard Smith said: "Some of the assertions in the dossier have been confirmed. Other parts are unconfirmed. None of the dossier, to Fox News's knowledge, has been disproven." In some cases, public verification is hindered because information is classified.

According to Ranking Member of the House Intelligence Committee Adam Schiff, a major portion of the dossier's content is about Russian efforts to help Trump, and those allegations "turned out to be true".

After the Mueller Report was released, Joshua Levy, counsel for Fusion GPS, issued this statement:

The Inspector General investigation by Michael E. Horowitz, published December 9, 2019, expressed doubts about the dossier's reliability and sources:

Adam Goldman and Charlie Savage described the dossier as "deeply flawed". They have also described it as a "compendium of rumors and unproven assertions". Ryan Lucas described it as an "explosive dossier of unsubstantiated and salacious material about President Trump's alleged ties with Russia".

Reputation in the U.S. intelligence community 

The process of evaluating Steele's information has been explained by Bill Priestap, at the time the Assistant Director of the FBI Counterintelligence Division:

On January 11, 2017, Paul Wood, of BBC News, wrote that the salacious information in Steele's dossier was also reported by "multiple intelligence sources" and "at least one East European intelligence service". They reported that "compromising material on Mr. Trump" included "more than one tape, not just video, but audio as well, on more than one date, in more than one place, in both Moscow and St. Petersburg". While also mentioning that "nobody should believe something just because an intelligence agent says it", Wood added that "the CIA believes it is credible that the Kremlin has such kompromat—or compromising material—on the next US commander in chief" and "a joint taskforce, that includes the CIA and the FBI, has been investigating allegations that the Russians may have sent money to Mr Trump's organisation or his election campaign".

On January 12, 2017, Susan Hennessey, a former National Security Agency lawyer now with the Brookings Institution, said: "My general take is that the intelligence community and law enforcement seem to be taking these claims seriously. That itself is highly significant. But it is not the same as these allegations being verified. Even if this was an intelligence community document—which it isn't—this kind of raw intelligence is still treated with skepticism." Hennessey and Benjamin Wittes wrote that "the current state of the evidence makes a powerful argument for a serious public inquiry into this matter".

On February 10, 2017, CNN reported that some communications between "senior Russian officials and other Russian individuals" described in the dossier had been corroborated by multiple U.S. officials. They "took place between the same individuals on the same days and from the same locations as detailed in the dossier". Some persons were known to be "heavily involved" in collecting information that could hurt Clinton and aid Trump. CNN was unable to confirm whether conversations were related to Trump. Sources told CNN some conversations had been "intercepted during routine intelligence gathering", but refused to reveal the content of conversations or specify which communications were intercepted because the information was classified. U.S. officials said the corroboration gave "US intelligence and law enforcement 'greater confidence' in the credibility of some aspects of the dossier as they continue to actively investigate its contents". They also reported that American intelligence agencies had examined Steele and his "vast network throughout Europe and found him and his sources to be credible".

On March 30, 2017, Paul Wood reported that the FBI was using the dossier as a roadmap for its investigation. On January 13, 2019, Sonam Sheth reported that the Senate Intelligence Committee was also using it as a roadmap for their investigation into Russia's election interference.

On April 18, 2017, CNN reported that, according to U.S. officials, information from the dossier had been used as part of the basis for getting the FISA warrant to monitor Page in October 2016. The Justice Department's inspector general revealed in 2019 that in the six weeks prior to its receipt of Steele's memos, the FBI's Crossfire Hurricane team "had discussions about the possibility of obtaining FISAs targeting Page and Papadopoulos, but it was determined that there was insufficient information at the time to proceed with an application to the court." The IG report described a changed situation after the FBI received Steele's memos and said the dossier then played a central role in the seeking of FISA warrants on Carter Page in terms of establishing FISA's low bar for probable cause: "FBI and Department officials told us the Steele reporting 'pushed [the FISA proposal] over the line' in terms of establishing probable cause."

Mimi Rocah, Dan Goldman, and Barbara McQuade debunked three false arguments made by National Review'''s Andrew C. McCarthy against the FBI's use of the dossier when seeking a FISA warrant on Carter Page. They explained why the FBI was justified in doing so and would have been "derelict" if it had not: "[McCarthy] misses the point. Even if the specific details in the Steele dossier are not directly confirmed, the fact that other evidence unrelated to the dossier corroborates the dossier's main allegations is sufficient to support a finding of probable cause."

Officials told CNN this information would have had to be independently corroborated by the FBI before being used to obtain the warrant, but CNN later reported "it's now clear that this level of verification never materialized". Steele told the FBI that Person 1 was a "boaster" and "egoist" who "may engage in some embellishment", "caveats about his source" that the FBI omitted from its FISA application. In his testimony before Congress, Glenn Simpson "confirmed that the FBI had sources of its own and that whatever the FBI learned from Steele was simply folded into its ongoing work".

British journalist Julian Borger wrote on October 7, 2017, that "Steele's reports are being taken seriously after lengthy scrutiny by federal and congressional investigators", at least Steele's assessment that Russia had conducted a campaign to interfere in the 2016 election to Clinton's detriment; that part of the Steele dossier "has generally gained in credibility, rather than lost it".

On October 11, 2017, it was reported that Senator Sheldon Whitehouse (D-Rhode Island), a member of the Senate Judiciary Committee (SJC), had said: "As I understand it, a good deal of his information remains unproven, but none of it has been disproven, and considerable amounts of it have been proven."

On October 25, 2017, James Clapper said that "some of the substantive content of the dossier we were able to corroborate in our Intelligence Community assessment which from other sources in which we had very high confidence."

On October 27, 2017, Robert S. Litt, a former lawyer for the Director of National Intelligence, was quoted as stating the dossier "played absolutely no role" in the intelligence community's determination that Russia had interfered in the 2016 U.S. presidential election.

On November 15, 2017, Adam Schiff said much of the dossier's content is about Russian efforts to help Trump, and those allegations "turned out to be true", something later affirmed by the January 6, 2017, intelligence community assessment released by the ODNI.

On December 7, 2017, commentator Jonathan Chait wrote that as "time goes by, more and more of the claims first reported by Steele have been borne out", with the mainstream media "treat[ing] [the dossier] as gossip" whereas the intelligence community "take it seriously".

On January 29, 2018, a House Intelligence Committee minority report stated that "multiple independent sources... corroborated Steele's reporting".

On January 29, 2018, Mark Warner, the top Democrat on the Senate Intelligence Committee, said "little of that dossier has either been fully proven or conversely, disproven".

John Sipher, who served 28 years as a clandestine CIA agent, including heading the agency's Russia program, said investigating the allegations requires access to non-public records. He said "[p]eople who say it's all garbage, or all true, are being politically biased", adding he believes that while the dossier may not be correct in every detail, it is "generally credible" and "In the intelligence business, you don't pretend you're a hundred per cent accurate. If you're seventy or eighty per cent accurate, that makes you one of the best." He said the Mueller investigation would ultimately judge its merits. Sipher has written that "Many of my former CIA colleagues have taken the [dossier] reports seriously since they were first published."

During his April 15, 2018, ABC News interview with George Stephanopoulos, former FBI Director James Comey described Steele as a "credible source, someone with a track record, someone who was a credible and respected member of an allied intelligence service during his career, and so it was important that we try to understand it, and see what could we verify, what could we rule in or rule out."

In May 2018, former career intelligence officer James Clapper believed that "more and more" of the dossier had been validated over time.

James Comey told the Office of the Inspector General that:

When DOJ Inspector General Michael E. Horowitz issued a report in December 2019 on the Crossfire Hurricane investigation, the report noted that the "FBI Intel Section Chief told us that the CIA viewed the Steele reporting as 'internet rumor'".

 Varied observations of dossier's veracity 

Steele, the author of the dossier, said he believes that 70–90% of the dossier is accurate, although he gives the "golden showers" allegation a 50% chance of being true. In testimony to Congress, Simpson quoted "Steele as saying that any intelligence, especially from Russia, is bound to carry intentional disinformation, but that Steele believes his dossier is 'largely not disinformation'." Steele has countered the suggestion that the Russians deliberately fed his sources misinformation that would undermine Trump: "The ultimate Russian goal was to prevent Hillary Clinton from becoming president, and therefore, the idea that they would intentionally spread embarrassing information about Trump—true or not—is not logical."

Other observers and experts have had varying reactions to the dossier. Generally, "former intelligence officers and other national-security experts" urged "skepticism and caution" but still took "the fact that the nation's top intelligence officials chose to present a summary version of the dossier to both President Obama and President-elect Trump" as an indication "that they may have had a relatively high degree of confidence that at least some of the claims therein were credible, or at least worth investigating further".

Vice President Joe Biden told reporters that, while he and Obama were receiving a briefing on the extent of election hacking attempts, there was a two-page addendum that addressed the contents of the Steele dossier. Top intelligence officials told them they "felt obligated to inform them about uncorroborated allegations about President-elect Donald Trump out of concern the information would become public and catch them off-guard".

On January 11, 2017, Newsweek published a list of "13 things that don't add up" in the dossier, writing that it was a "strange mix of the amateur and the insightful" and stating that it "contains lots of Kremlin-related gossip that could indeed be, as the author claims, from deep insiders—or equally gleaned" from Russian newspapers and blogs. Former UK ambassador to Russia Sir Tony Brenton said certain aspects of the dossier were inconsistent with British intelligence's understanding of how the Kremlin works, commenting: "I've seen quite a lot of intelligence on Russia, and there are some things in [the dossier] which look pretty shaky."

In his June 2017 Senate Intelligence Committee testimony, former FBI director James Comey said "some personally sensitive aspects" of the dossier were unverified when he briefed Trump on them on January 6, 2017. Comey also said he could not say publicly whether any of the allegations in the dossier had been confirmed.

Trump and his supporters have challenged the veracity of the dossier because it was funded in part by the Clinton campaign and the DNC, while Democrats assert the funding source is irrelevant.

In June 2019, investigators for Inspector General Michael E. Horowitz found Steele's testimony surprising and his "information sufficiently credible to have to extend the investigation".

In November 2019, the founders of Fusion GPS published a book about the dossier and had this to say about its veracity:

David A. Graham of The Atlantic has noted that in spite of Trump's "mantra that 'there was no collusion'... it is clear that the Trump campaign and later transition were eager to work with Russia, and to keep that secret."

Adam Goldman and Charlie Savage of The New York Times have described the impact of some of the flaws in the dossier:

 Subject of investigations and conspiracy theories 
 Investigations 

The FBI Operation Crossfire Hurricane investigation into Russian interference, that started on July 31, 2016, was not triggered by the dossier, but the dossier is still the subject of the Russia investigation origins counter-narrative, a conspiracy theory pushed by Trump and Fox News.

In January 2018, ABC News described how the FBI would not open an investigation based on one document like Steele's unverified report but it still needed to investigate its allegations "rather than accept them as evidence". The Russian interference investigation was opened because of previously existing concerns: John Brennan testified he was already "aware of intelligence and information about contacts between Russian officials and U.S. persons that raised concerns" and it was that knowledge that "served as the basis for the FBI investigation to determine whether such collusion [or] cooperation occurred". ABC wrote that "For the FBI, the dossier was essentially just another tip" that must be investigated.

The Mueller Report, a summary of the findings of the Special Counsel investigation into Russian interference in the 2016 U.S. elections, contained passing references to some of the dossier's allegations but little mention of its more sensational claims. It was a major subject of the Nunes memo, the Democratic rebuttal memo, and the Inspector General report on the Crossfire Hurricane investigation.

The investigations led to Fusion GPS founder Glenn Simpson being interviewed in August 2017 by Congress.

John Durham has been investigating whether FBI agents "mishandled classified information" about operation Crossfire Hurricane when they questioned Steele. The IG report documents that a case agent mentioned Papadopoulos to Steele. The FBI has no "established guidelines for how to address the disclosure of sensitive or classified information to sources", and the Inspector General "concluded that the case agent should not be faulted".

Durham sought to get more information by seeking access to evidence gathered in a British lawsuit filed by the founders of Alfa-Bank. A July 21, 2020, court filing shows that Durham has sought the lifting of "a protective order on evidence that had been gathered". Politico wrote that legal experts said this move was "highly unusual... and suggests the British government was not involved in, or cooperating with, Durham's criminal investigation".

 Conspiracy theories 

The Russia investigation origins counter-narrative is a right-wing alternative narrative, sometimes identified as a conspiracy theory, concerning the origins of the Special Counsel investigation into Russian interference in the 2016 United States elections. These conspiracy theories have been pushed by Trump, Fox News, GOP politicians like Representative Jim Jordan (R-Ohio), and Trump's Director of National Intelligence John Ratcliffe. On November 2, 2020, the day before the presidential election, New York magazine reported that:

The conspiracy theory falsely claims the dossier triggered the Russia investigation and was used as an excuse by the FBI to start it. It also aims to discredit Steele and thus discredit the whole investigation. The real trigger for the July 31 opening of the investigation was two connected events: the July 22 release by WikiLeaks of Democratic National Committee emails stolen by Russian hackers and the July 26 revelation by the Australian government of the bragging by Papadopoulos of Russian offers to aid the Trump campaign by releasing those emails.

The dossier could not have had any role in the opening of the Russia investigation on July 31, 2016, as top FBI officials received the dossier the following September. Instead, it was the activities of George Papadopoulos that started the investigation. The investigation by Inspector General Michael E. Horowitz into Russian interference and alleged FISA abuses found that "none of the evidence used to open the [original Crossfire Hurricane FBI] investigation" came from the C.I.A. or Trump–Russia dossier. On February 4, 2018, Rep. Trey Gowdy (R-S.C.) affirmed that the Russia probe would have happened without the dossier: "So there's going to be a Russia probe, even without a dossier." Also in February 2018, the Nunes memo stated: "The Papadopoulos information triggered the opening of an FBI counterintelligence investigation in late July 2016 by FBI agent Pete Strzok."

The founders of Fusion GPS did not expect their connections to Bruce and Nellie Ohr, Steele, Hillary Clinton, and the FBI to "become public and subsequently provide the framework for a deep-state conspiracy theory".

The dossier also figures as part of the Spygate conspiracy theory and conspiracy theories related to the Trump–Ukraine scandal. According to The Wall Street Journal, President Trump's actions in the Trump–Ukraine scandal stemmed from his belief that Ukraine was responsible for the Steele Dossier. Trump has insinuated that the dossier had its origins in Ukraine, that the Clintons were involved, that Hillary Clinton's email server is currently secreted in Ukraine, and that Clinton's deleted emails are in Ukraine.

The dossier is central to Republican assertions that Trump is the victim of an intelligence community conspiracy to take him down. Democrats see this focus on the dossier as conspiratorial. Congressman Devin Nunes, a staunch Trump defender, asserted as fact that the dossier originated in Ukraine during his questioning of EU ambassador Gordon Sondland during the Trump impeachment inquiry hearings in September 2019. Nunes also accused Hillary Clinton of colluding with Russia to get dirt on Trump. A fact-check by The Washington Post analyzed the claim and the role of the dossier. It found the claim to be false and gave it four Pinocchios.

According to Eric Lutz, Matt Gaetz and Jim Jordan have pushed a conspiracy theory that the dossier was "based on Russian disinformation". The inspector general's report concluded "that more should have been done to examine Steele's contacts with intermediaries of Russian oligarchs in order to assess those contacts as potential sources of disinformation that could have influenced Steele's reporting".

David Frum also described a "suddenly red-hot media campaign to endorse Trump's fantasy that he was the victim of a 'Russia hoax.'" Frum argued that "anti-anti-Trump journalists want to use the Steele controversy to score points off politicians and media institutions that they dislike," and thus they "help him execute one of his Big Lies".

Heather Digby Parton described why we should "forget the Steele dossier" as a "reason for the Russia investigation": "No doubt there was some histrionic coverage of the Steele Dossier. But the truth is that virtually every news outlet that reported it made clear that it was unsubstantiated and no one reported that it was the only reason for the Russia investigation. Trump and his campaign's suspicious behavior was more than enough to set off alarms all over the world."

 Denials of specific accusations 
 Michael Cohen 

Dossier source(s) allege that Cohen and three colleagues met Kremlin officials in the Prague offices of Rossotrudnichestvo in August 2016, to arrange for payments to the hackers, cover up the hack, and "cover up ties between Trump and Russia, including Manafort's involvement in Ukraine".

In 2016, Cohen told Mother Jones that he had visited Prague briefly 14 years before. The Wall Street Journal reported Cohen telling them (at an unspecified date) that he had been in Prague in 2001. Following the dossier's publication, as well as after subsequent reports, Cohen repeatedly denied having ever been to Prague.  Cohen's attorney Lanny Davis said Cohen was "never, ever" in Prague, and that all allegations mentioning Cohen in the Steele dossier were false.

Cohen's passport showed that he entered Italy in early July 2016, and that he left Italy in mid-July 2016, from Rome, Italy. Buzzfeed News in May 2017 reported Cohen telling them that he was in Capri, Italy for the time period in question with his family, friends, and musician and actor Steven van Zandt, and that receipts would prove he had been on Capri, but he declined to provide them. Roger Friedman reported sources quoting van Zandt's wife, Maureen, as saying that she and Steven were in Rome, and never travelled to Capri. From this, Nancy LeTourneau of Washington Monthly commented that Cohen may have "lost his alibi", and thus doubted if he had really not travelled to Prague. A December 2018 statement from Steven van Zandt's Twitter said that he had met Cohen in Rome and not travelled together. In March 2019, The Washington Post reported that Cohen had been in Capri and Rome during his Italy trip, and that Cohen said he met Steven van Zandt in Rome.

Cohen has also stated that he was in Los Angeles between August 23 and 29, and in New York for the entire month of September.

 Aleksej Gubarev 

Gubarev has denied all accusations made in the dossier. The accusations are twofold, as they mention Gubarev and his companies. While it has been proven that his companies were used to facilitate cybercrimes,
Andrew Weisburd has said that "Neither BuzzFeed nor Steele have accused Gubarev of being a willing participant in wrongdoing."

 Paul Manafort 

Manafort has "denied taking part in any collusion with the Russian state, but registered himself as a foreign agent retroactively after it was revealed his firm received more than $17m working as a lobbyist for a pro-Russian Ukrainian party."

 Carter Page 

Page originally denied meeting any Russian officials, but his later testimony, acknowledging that he had met with senior Russian officials at Rosneft, has been interpreted as corroboration of portions of the dossier. On February 11, 2021, Page lost a defamation suit he had filed against Yahoo! News and HuffPost for their articles describing his activities mentioned in the Steele dossier. The judge said that Page admitted the articles about his potential contacts with Russian officials were essentially true.

 Donald Trump 

Trump addressed the "golden showers" allegation in January 2017, publicly stating: "Does anyone really believe that story? I'm also very much of a germaphobe, by the way."

According to FBI Director James Comey, in private conversations between him and Trump in early 2017, Trump denied the "golden showers" allegation, with one reason given being that he did not stay overnight in Moscow at the time of the Miss Universe contest in 2013, and another being that he assumed he was always being recorded when in Russia. Per flight records, Trump stayed overnight in Moscow the night before the pageant, then during the night of the pageant, he left Moscow at 3:58 a.m.

According to Comey, Trump's false denials on whether he had stayed overnight in Moscow, despite Comey not asking about it, exhibited behaviour that "tends to reflect consciousness of guilt", but this conclusion is "not definitive", said Comey.

Trump publicly disputed that he had issued such a denial to Comey: "He said I didn't stay there a night. Of course I stayed there ... I stayed there a very short period of time but of course I stayed."

 Reactions to dossier 

 Trump 

Donald Trump's first Twitter reaction to the dossier was a January 10, 2017, tweet: "FAKE NEWS—A TOTAL POLITICAL WITCH HUNT!", a view echoed the next day by the Kremlin: "absolute fabrication". Trump has repeatedly condemned the dossier and denied collusion with Russia, including in a December 26, 2017, tweet, in which he quoted from Fox & Friends.

Trump has called the dossier "fake news" and criticized the intelligence and media sources that published it. During a press conference on January 11, 2017, Trump denounced the dossier's claims as false, saying it was "disgraceful" for U.S. intelligence agencies to report them. In response to Trump's criticism, CNN said it had published "carefully sourced reporting" on the matter that had been "matched by the other major news organizations", as opposed to BuzzFeeds posting of "unsubstantiated claims".The Wall Street Journal reported that the DNC and the Clinton campaign paid a total of $12.4 million to Perkins Coie for legal and compliance services during the 2016 campaign. This led Trump to claim the dossier had cost $12 million. The actual cost was far less. According to Fusion GPS, Perkins Coie paid them $1.02million in fees and expenses, and Fusion GPS paid $168,000 to Steele's firm, Orbis Business Intelligence, to produce the dossier. Despite that, Trump and his son Donald Trump Jr. continued to claim for more than a year that Steele was paid "millions of dollars" for his work.

A footnote in the Mueller Report revealed that Trump requested James Comey and James Clapper to publicly refute the dossier. The two men then exchanged emails about the request, with Clapper saying that "Trump wanted him to say the dossier was 'bogus, which, of course, I can't do'."

On July 11, 2020, Trump tweeted that Steele should be extradited.

 Mueller Report 

In July 2019, Special Agent in Charge David Archey briefed the Senate Intelligence Committee about certain aspects of the Special Counsel Office's (SCO) "investigative process and information management":

He "declined to provide further information on whether FBI or SCO attempted to verify information in the dossier, although he noted that the SCO did not draw on the dossier to support its conclusions."

 Others 

Russia has backed Trump by attacking the dossier and denying its allegations, calling it an "absolute fabrication" and "a hoax intended to further damage  relations".

As Putin's press secretary, Peskov insisted in an interview that the dossier is a fraud, saying "I can assure you that the allegations in this funny paper, in this so-called report, they are untrue. They are all fake." Putin called the people who leaked the dossier "worse than prostitutes" and referred to the dossier itself as "rubbish". Putin went on to state he believed the dossier was "clearly fake", fabricated as a plot against the legitimacy of President-elect Trump.

Some of Steele's former colleagues expressed support for his character, saying "The idea his work is fake or a cowboy operation is false—completely untrue. Chris is an experienced and highly regarded professional. He's not the sort of person who will simply pass on gossip."

Among journalists, Bob Woodward called the dossier a "garbage document". Chuck Todd of CBS News labeled the report "fake news". Carl Bernstein said "It's not fake news, otherwise senior-most intelligence chiefs would not have done this." Ben Smith, editor of BuzzFeed, wrote: "The dossier is a document... of obvious central public importance. It's the subject of multiple investigations by intelligence agencies, by Congress. That was clear a year ago. It's a lot clearer now."

Ynet, an Israeli online news site, reported on January 12, 2017, that U.S. intelligence advised Israeli intelligence officers to be cautious about sharing information with the incoming Trump administration, until the possibility of Russian influence over Trump, suggested by Steele's report, has been fully investigated.

On January 2, 2018, Simpson and Fritsch authored an op-ed in The New York Times, requesting that Republicans "release full transcripts of our firm's testimony" and further wrote that, "the Steele dossier was not the trigger for the FBI's investigation into Russian meddling. As we told the Senate Judiciary Committee in August, our sources said the dossier was taken so seriously because it corroborated reports the bureau had received from other sources, including one inside the Trump camp." Ken Dilanian of NBC News said a "source close to Fusion GPS" told him the FBI had not planted anyone in the Trump camp, but rather that Simpson was referring to Papadopoulos.

On January 4, 2018, U.S. District Court Judge Amit P. Mehta ruled on Trump's repeated tweets describing the dossier as "fake" or "discredited":

On January 5, 2018, in the first known Congressional criminal referral resulting from investigations related to the Russian interference in the 2016 U.S. election, Grassley made a referral to the Justice Department suggesting that they investigate possible criminal charges against Steele for allegedly making false statements to the FBI about the distribution of the dossier's claims, specifically possible "inconsistencies" in what Steele told authorities and "possibly lying to FBI officials". Senator Lindsey Graham also signed the letter. Both Grassley and Graham declared that they were not alleging that Steele "had committed any crime. Rather, they had passed on the information for 'further investigation only'." The referral was met with skepticism from legal experts, as well as some of the other Republicans and Democrats on the Judiciary committee, who reportedly had not been consulted.

On January 8, 2018, a spokesman for Grassley said he did not plan to release the transcript of Simpson's August 22, 2017, testimony before the SJC. The next day, ranking committee member Senator Dianne Feinstein unilaterally released the transcript.

On January 10, 2018, Fox News host Sean Hannity appeared to have advance information on the forthcoming release of the Nunes memo and its assertions about the dossier, saying "more shocking information will be coming out in just days that will show systemic FISA abuse". Hannity asserted that this new information would reveal "a totally phony document full of Russian lies and propaganda that was then used by the Obama administration to surveil members of an opposition party and incoming president," adding that this was "the real Russia collusion story" that represented a "precipice of one of the largest abuses of power in U.S. American history. And I'm talking about the literal shredding of the U.S. Constitution."

In April 2018, the White House Correspondents' Association (WHCA) gave The Merriman Smith Memorial Award to CNN reporters Evan Perez, Jim Sciutto, Jake Tapper and Carl Bernstein. In January 2017, they reported that the intelligence community had briefed Obama and Trump of allegations that Russians claimed to have "compromising personal and financial information" on then-President elect Donald Trump. WHCA noted that "[t]hanks to this CNN investigation, 'the dossier' is now part of the lexicon".

As late as July 29, 2018, Trump continued to falsely insist the FBI investigation of Russian interference was initiated because of the dossier, and three days later White House press secretary Sarah Sanders repeated the false assertion. Fox News host Shepard Smith said of Trump's assertion: "In the main and in its parts, that statement is patently false."

Alan Huffman, an expert on opposition research, has compared the two forms of opposition research represented by the dossier and WikiLeaks. He didn't believe the dossier's intelligence gathering to be illegitimate, although "a little strange", while he was troubled by the large dump of documents from WikiLeaks that "may have been obtained in an illegal way".

In March 2020, Steele commented publicly on the dossier, stating: "I stand by the integrity of our work, our sources and what we did."

 Litigation 
 Against BuzzFeed News and Fusion GPS 
 Filed by Gubarev 

On February 3, 2017, Aleksej Gubarev, chief of technology company XBT and a figure mentioned in the dossier, sued BuzzFeed News for defamation. The suit, filed in a Broward County, Florida court, centers on allegations from the dossier that XBT had been "using botnets and porn traffic to transmit viruses, plant bugs, steal data and conduct 'altering operations' against the Democratic Party leadership". In the High Court of Justice, Steele's lawyers said their client did not intend for the reports to be released, and that one of the reports "needed to be analyzed and further investigated/verified". In response to the lawsuit, BuzzFeed News hired the business advisory firm FTI Consulting to investigate the dossier's allegations. BuzzFeed News has sued the DNC in an attempt to force the disclosure of information it believes will bolster its defense against libel allegations. Fusion GPS "has claimed that it did not provide the dossier to BuzzFeed".

In connection with the libel suit against them by Gubarev, on June 30, 2017, BuzzFeed News subpoenaed the CIA, the FBI, and the Office of the Director of National Intelligence. They also sought "testimony from fired FBI Director James Comey, as well as former DNI James Clapper and CIA Director John Brennan". They were interested in using the discovery process to get information about the distribution of the dossier, how it had circulated among government officials, and the "existence and scope of the federal government's investigation into the dossier". They hoped "the information could bolster BuzzFeeds claim that publication of the document was protected by the fair report privilege, which can immunize reports based on official government records." On June 4, 2018, Judge Ursula Ungaro ruled that BuzzFeed News could claim "fair report privilege" for the publication of the dossier and its accompanying article, bolstering BuzzFeeds defense.

Cyber security and intelligence expert Andrew Weisburd has said both Gubarev and the dossier "can be right": "Their explanation is entirely plausible, as is the Steele Dossier's description of Mr. Gubarev as essentially a victim of predatory officers of one or more Russian intelligence services.... Neither BuzzFeed nor Steele have accused Gubarev of being a willing participant in wrongdoing."

On December 19, 2018, Judge Ursula Ungaro sided with BuzzFeed News in the defamation suit filed by Gubarev, defending BuzzFeeds privilege to publish and the public's right to know about the allegations against Trump.BuzzFeed News apologized for publishing Gubarev's name and redacted it.

 Filed by Fridman, Aven, and Khan 

In May 2017, Mikhail Fridman, Petr Aven, and German Khan—the owners of Alfa-Bank—filed a defamation lawsuit against BuzzFeed News for publishing the unverified dossier, that describes financial ties and collusion between Putin, Trump, and the three bank owners.

The case against Orbis was dismissed based on the Anti-SLAPP Act because Steele's speech was protected by the First Amendment, that generally protects speech in the U.S. by non-U.S.-citizens/residents.

In October 2017, Fridman, Aven, and Khan also filed a libel suit against Fusion GPS and Glenn Simpson for circulating the dossier among journalists and allowing it to be published.

The three oligarchs dropped their lawsuit against Fusion GPS in March 2022.

 Filed by Michael Cohen 

On January 9, 2018, Michael Cohen sued BuzzFeed News and Fusion GPS for defamation over allegations about him in the dossier. On April 19, 2018, ten days after his home, office and hotel room were raided by the FBI as part of a criminal investigation, Cohen filed a motion to voluntarily dismiss the suit.

 Filed by Devin Nunes 

On September 4, 2019, Devin Nunes filed a racketeering lawsuit in federal court against Fusion GPS seeking $10 million in damages. He accused them of harassment and impeding his investigation into Fusion GPS's role in raising suspicions about Trump's ties to Russian interference in the 2016 campaign. The suit was dismissed on February 21, 2020. Nunes then filed an amended complaint which allowed the suit to continue. This was the third amended complaint filed since September 2019. On March 31, 2021, the court dismissed the claim "with prejudice" and a warning that "litigation 'asserted in bad faith or for the purpose of harassment' may be met with sanctions".

 Against Steele and Orbis Business Intelligence. Filed by Fridman, Aven, and Khan 

On April 16, 2018, Alfa-Bank owners Fridman, Aven, and Khan filed a libel suit against Steele and Orbis Business Intelligence, since the dossier describes financial ties and collusion between Putin, Trump, and the three bank owners. The lawsuit was filed in Washington D.C. Steele's lawyers filed two motions to dismiss the case, accusing the three men of intimidation.

On August 20, 2018, a judge in the Superior Court of the District of Columbia threw out the libel suit. The case was dismissed with prejudice in response to a motion by lawyers for Orbis Business Intelligence. Without assessing whether the dossier was "accurate or not accurate", the judge determined that Steele was protected by the First Amendment, that protects freedom of speech. He also cited the District of Columbia's anti-SLAPP law, that prevents the filing of frivolous suits to silence critics. He also pointed out its importance to the public interest: "The Steele dossier generated so much interest and attention in the US precisely because its contents relate to active public debates here."

On June 18, 2020, an appellate court upheld the dismissal of their defamation lawsuit against Steele and Orbis Business Intelligence.

Alfa-Bank partners Petr Aven, Mikhail Fridman, and German Khan brought a lawsuit for defamation in Britain against Orbis Business Intelligence, Steele's private intelligence firm. In July 2020, Justice Warby from the Queen's Bench Division of the British High Court of Justice ordered Orbis to pay damages to Aven and Fridman who Steele claimed had delivered "large amounts of illicit cash" to Vladimir Putin when Putin was deputy mayor of St. Petersburg. Judge Warby ruled that the claim was "inaccurate and misleading" and awarded the damages to compensate "for the loss of autonomy, distress and reputational damage caused by the breaches of duty". The judge stated that Steele's dossier also inaccurately claimed that Aven and Fridman provided foreign policy advice to Putin.

Aleksej Gubarev has filed a defamation lawsuit against Steele alleging the dossier made "seriously defamatory allegations". At issue was whether Orbis/Steele was responsible for the publication of the "December memorandum" by BuzzFeed, a charge denied by Steele. The defendants said that BuzzFeeds publication of the memorandum was "unauthorized" and they "did not intend the December memorandum or its content to be made public (and) did not provide the December memorandum to BuzzFeed or any other media organization." The Senate Intelligence Committee wrote that "Fusion GPS's work for Perkins Coie ended on Election Day. Steele's final memorandum was completed on December 13, 2016. No one paid for it."

On October 30, 2020, Gubarev lost his libel case when the High Court ruled in Steele's favor. Judge Warby explained that the allegations about Gubarev were indeed defamatory and that their publication "caused serious harm to his reputation", but that Gubarev had failed to prove that Steele was responsible for the publication of the dossier, and that he therefore should not pay damages.

 Against DNC and Perkins Coie. Filed by Carter Page 

In October 2018, Carter Page sued the DNC, Perkins Coie, and two Perkins Coie partners, for defamation. The lawsuit was dismissed on January 31, 2019. Page said he intended to appeal the decision.

On January 30, 2020, Page filed another defamation lawsuit (Case: 1:20-cv-00671, Filed: 01/30/20) against the DNC and Perkins Coie, naming Marc Elias and Michael Sussmann as defendants. The suit was dismissed. Page then appealed the lower court's dismissal to the Supreme Court. In January 2022, it declined to review the defamation lawsuit.

 Against Mueller and the DOJ. Filed by Giorgi Rtskhiladze 

On June 17, 2020, Giorgi Rtskhiladze sued Robert Mueller and the Department of Justice for defamation related to the mention of Rtskhiladze in a footnote in the Mueller Report. Rtskhiladze claims that he was falsely identified as a "Russian businessman" in the footnote. He is a U.S. citizen who was born in Georgia, a former Soviet republic, who emigrated to the U.S. in 1991. He is "seeking $100 million in damages and an injunction that would force DOJ to hastily remove all future references to him in the Mueller Report". The suit was dismissed on September 1, 2021.

 Against Oath Inc. (Yahoo! News and HuffPost). Filed by Carter Page 

On February 11, 2021, Page lost a defamation suit he had filed against Yahoo! News and HuffPost'' for their articles that described his activities mentioned in the Steele dossier. The judge said that Page admitted the articles about his potential contacts with Russian officials were essentially true. 

Page's suit targeted Oath for 11 articles, especially one written by Michael Isikoff and published by Yahoo! News in September 2016. The judge dismissed the suit on February 11, 2021, noting that "Page's arguments regarding Isikoff's description of the dossier and Steele were 'either sophistry or political spin'." He also said that Page "failed to allege actual malice by any of the authors, and that the three articles written by HuffPost employees were true". Page was represented by attorneys John Pierce and L. Lin Wood, who was denied permission to represent Page because of his actions in the attempts to overturn the 2020 United States presidential election in favor of President Donald Trump.

In January 2022, Page lost an effort to revive the defamation case over Isikoff's article. Chief Justice Collins J. Seitz Jr. said "the article at the crux of the case—by Yahoo News reporter Michael Isikoff—was either completely truthful or, 'at a minimum,' conveyed a true 'gist,' even if it included some 'minor' or 'irrelevant' incorrect statements." Bloomberg Law reported that "The court dismissed as far-fetched Page's theories about a conspiracy among interconnected media and political figures to tarnish Trump by concocting the Russia investigation from thin air."

On May 16, 2022, the U.S. Supreme Court refused to hear a defamation suit filed by Page.

Against USA, DOJ, FBI, and several officials. Filed by Carter Page 

On November 27, 2020, Page filed a $75 million suit against the United States, DOJ, FBI, and several former leading officials for the "defendants' multiple violations of his Constitutional and other legal rights in connection with unlawful surveillance and investigation of him by the United States Government." The defendants included James Comey, Andrew McCabe, Kevin Clinesmith, Peter Strzok, Lisa Page, Joe Pientka III, Stephen Soma, and Brian J. Auten.

The suit was dismissed on September 1, 2022, by United States district court judge Dabney L. Friedrich, who wrote:

Against Hillary Clinton, Christopher Steele, and others. Filed by Donald Trump 

On March 24, 2022, Trump filed a RICO lawsuit against Clinton, Steele, and many others. The case was dismissed on September 8, 2022. The judge wrote that "despite the numerous references to [Steele] in Trump's lawsuit, 'none specifically attribute any false statement about Plaintiff to him'".

See also

References

Further reading 

 Books
 
 
 

 News, magazines, and websites
 
 
 
 
 
 
 

 Government sources
 
 
 
 
 
 See: Section IV B. "The Steele Dossier: Its Origins and Handling", pages 846-930. 

 Timelines

External links 

 
 
 

Russia dossier
Russia dossier
Espionage scandals and incidents
Mass media-related controversies in the United States
Russian interference in the 2016 United States elections
Opposition research
Whistleblowing
Allegations
Russia–United Kingdom relations
Russia–United States relations
United Kingdom–United States relations
2016 documents
2017 controversies in the United States
Trump, Donald Russia dossier

fr:Christopher Steele#Russiagate